

148001–148100 

|-bgcolor=#fefefe
| 148001 ||  || — || March 5, 1997 || La Silla || E. W. Elst || — || align=right | 1.4 km || 
|-id=002 bgcolor=#fefefe
| 148002 ||  || — || April 7, 1997 || Kitt Peak || Spacewatch || NYS || align=right | 3.0 km || 
|-id=003 bgcolor=#fefefe
| 148003 ||  || — || April 5, 1997 || Socorro || LINEAR || FLO || align=right | 1.0 km || 
|-id=004 bgcolor=#fefefe
| 148004 ||  || — || April 6, 1997 || Socorro || LINEAR || PHO || align=right | 2.0 km || 
|-id=005 bgcolor=#d6d6d6
| 148005 ||  || — || April 7, 1997 || Kitt Peak || Spacewatch || THM || align=right | 3.4 km || 
|-id=006 bgcolor=#fefefe
| 148006 ||  || — || April 30, 1997 || Socorro || LINEAR || — || align=right | 4.0 km || 
|-id=007 bgcolor=#fefefe
| 148007 ||  || — || May 3, 1997 || La Silla || E. W. Elst || — || align=right | 1.8 km || 
|-id=008 bgcolor=#fefefe
| 148008 ||  || — || May 3, 1997 || La Silla || E. W. Elst || — || align=right | 1.3 km || 
|-id=009 bgcolor=#d6d6d6
| 148009 || 1997 NW || — || July 3, 1997 || Dynic || A. Sugie || EUP || align=right | 8.5 km || 
|-id=010 bgcolor=#E9E9E9
| 148010 ||  || — || September 28, 1997 || Kitt Peak || Spacewatch || — || align=right | 1.6 km || 
|-id=011 bgcolor=#E9E9E9
| 148011 ||  || — || October 2, 1997 || Kitt Peak || Spacewatch || — || align=right | 3.2 km || 
|-id=012 bgcolor=#E9E9E9
| 148012 ||  || — || October 6, 1997 || Xinglong || SCAP || EUN || align=right | 2.4 km || 
|-id=013 bgcolor=#E9E9E9
| 148013 ||  || — || October 21, 1997 || Xinglong || SCAP || — || align=right | 1.4 km || 
|-id=014 bgcolor=#E9E9E9
| 148014 ||  || — || November 5, 1997 || Prescott || P. G. Comba || — || align=right | 4.2 km || 
|-id=015 bgcolor=#E9E9E9
| 148015 ||  || — || November 23, 1997 || Kitt Peak || Spacewatch || — || align=right | 2.6 km || 
|-id=016 bgcolor=#E9E9E9
| 148016 ||  || — || November 28, 1997 || Kitt Peak || Spacewatch || — || align=right | 1.8 km || 
|-id=017 bgcolor=#E9E9E9
| 148017 ||  || — || November 29, 1997 || Socorro || LINEAR || — || align=right | 3.6 km || 
|-id=018 bgcolor=#E9E9E9
| 148018 ||  || — || December 29, 1997 || Kitt Peak || Spacewatch || — || align=right | 4.2 km || 
|-id=019 bgcolor=#E9E9E9
| 148019 ||  || — || December 31, 1997 || Socorro || LINEAR || — || align=right | 6.7 km || 
|-id=020 bgcolor=#E9E9E9
| 148020 ||  || — || January 2, 1998 || Kitt Peak || Spacewatch || — || align=right | 2.9 km || 
|-id=021 bgcolor=#E9E9E9
| 148021 || 1998 CT || — || February 4, 1998 || Modra || A. Galád, A. Pravda || — || align=right | 2.7 km || 
|-id=022 bgcolor=#d6d6d6
| 148022 ||  || — || February 6, 1998 || La Silla || E. W. Elst || HYG || align=right | 5.4 km || 
|-id=023 bgcolor=#E9E9E9
| 148023 ||  || — || February 20, 1998 || Farra d'Isonzo || Farra d'Isonzo || — || align=right | 4.5 km || 
|-id=024 bgcolor=#E9E9E9
| 148024 ||  || — || February 24, 1998 || Kitt Peak || Spacewatch || — || align=right | 3.2 km || 
|-id=025 bgcolor=#E9E9E9
| 148025 ||  || — || February 24, 1998 || Kitt Peak || Spacewatch || WIT || align=right | 1.6 km || 
|-id=026 bgcolor=#d6d6d6
| 148026 ||  || — || February 26, 1998 || Haleakala || NEAT || — || align=right | 4.4 km || 
|-id=027 bgcolor=#E9E9E9
| 148027 ||  || — || March 8, 1998 || Xinglong || SCAP || PAL || align=right | 3.2 km || 
|-id=028 bgcolor=#d6d6d6
| 148028 ||  || — || March 1, 1998 || La Silla || E. W. Elst || NAE || align=right | 6.6 km || 
|-id=029 bgcolor=#E9E9E9
| 148029 ||  || — || March 20, 1998 || Kitt Peak || Spacewatch || — || align=right | 3.0 km || 
|-id=030 bgcolor=#E9E9E9
| 148030 ||  || — || March 26, 1998 || Haleakala || NEAT || — || align=right | 6.3 km || 
|-id=031 bgcolor=#d6d6d6
| 148031 ||  || — || March 31, 1998 || Socorro || LINEAR || — || align=right | 5.6 km || 
|-id=032 bgcolor=#E9E9E9
| 148032 ||  || — || March 29, 1998 || Socorro || LINEAR || HNA || align=right | 4.4 km || 
|-id=033 bgcolor=#fefefe
| 148033 ||  || — || June 28, 1998 || La Silla || E. W. Elst || — || align=right | 1.5 km || 
|-id=034 bgcolor=#fefefe
| 148034 ||  || — || August 17, 1998 || Socorro || LINEAR || — || align=right | 1.2 km || 
|-id=035 bgcolor=#E9E9E9
| 148035 ||  || — || August 17, 1998 || Socorro || LINEAR || — || align=right | 1.9 km || 
|-id=036 bgcolor=#fefefe
| 148036 ||  || — || September 14, 1998 || Socorro || LINEAR || — || align=right | 1.7 km || 
|-id=037 bgcolor=#fefefe
| 148037 ||  || — || September 14, 1998 || Socorro || LINEAR || NYS || align=right | 1.3 km || 
|-id=038 bgcolor=#fefefe
| 148038 ||  || — || September 14, 1998 || Socorro || LINEAR || — || align=right | 3.3 km || 
|-id=039 bgcolor=#fefefe
| 148039 ||  || — || September 14, 1998 || Socorro || LINEAR || — || align=right | 1.6 km || 
|-id=040 bgcolor=#fefefe
| 148040 ||  || — || September 14, 1998 || Socorro || LINEAR || NYS || align=right data-sort-value="0.84" | 840 m || 
|-id=041 bgcolor=#fefefe
| 148041 ||  || — || September 14, 1998 || Socorro || LINEAR || — || align=right | 2.1 km || 
|-id=042 bgcolor=#E9E9E9
| 148042 ||  || — || September 14, 1998 || Socorro || LINEAR || MAR || align=right | 2.9 km || 
|-id=043 bgcolor=#fefefe
| 148043 ||  || — || September 22, 1998 || Anderson Mesa || LONEOS || — || align=right | 1.6 km || 
|-id=044 bgcolor=#E9E9E9
| 148044 ||  || — || September 26, 1998 || Socorro || LINEAR || — || align=right | 2.0 km || 
|-id=045 bgcolor=#fefefe
| 148045 ||  || — || September 20, 1998 || La Silla || E. W. Elst || NYS || align=right | 3.1 km || 
|-id=046 bgcolor=#fefefe
| 148046 ||  || — || September 21, 1998 || Socorro || LINEAR || — || align=right | 2.0 km || 
|-id=047 bgcolor=#fefefe
| 148047 ||  || — || September 21, 1998 || La Silla || E. W. Elst || NYS || align=right | 1.5 km || 
|-id=048 bgcolor=#fefefe
| 148048 ||  || — || September 26, 1998 || Socorro || LINEAR || V || align=right | 1.2 km || 
|-id=049 bgcolor=#fefefe
| 148049 ||  || — || September 26, 1998 || Socorro || LINEAR || — || align=right | 3.9 km || 
|-id=050 bgcolor=#fefefe
| 148050 ||  || — || September 26, 1998 || Socorro || LINEAR || — || align=right | 1.3 km || 
|-id=051 bgcolor=#E9E9E9
| 148051 ||  || — || September 26, 1998 || Socorro || LINEAR || — || align=right | 1.5 km || 
|-id=052 bgcolor=#E9E9E9
| 148052 ||  || — || September 26, 1998 || Socorro || LINEAR || — || align=right | 4.2 km || 
|-id=053 bgcolor=#fefefe
| 148053 ||  || — || September 26, 1998 || Socorro || LINEAR || NYS || align=right | 3.1 km || 
|-id=054 bgcolor=#fefefe
| 148054 ||  || — || September 26, 1998 || Socorro || LINEAR || — || align=right | 1.2 km || 
|-id=055 bgcolor=#fefefe
| 148055 ||  || — || September 26, 1998 || Socorro || LINEAR || — || align=right | 1.5 km || 
|-id=056 bgcolor=#fefefe
| 148056 ||  || — || September 26, 1998 || Socorro || LINEAR || MAS || align=right | 1.3 km || 
|-id=057 bgcolor=#fefefe
| 148057 ||  || — || September 26, 1998 || Socorro || LINEAR || — || align=right | 1.4 km || 
|-id=058 bgcolor=#fefefe
| 148058 ||  || — || September 17, 1998 || Anderson Mesa || LONEOS || — || align=right | 1.2 km || 
|-id=059 bgcolor=#fefefe
| 148059 ||  || — || September 17, 1998 || Anderson Mesa || LONEOS || NYS || align=right | 1.1 km || 
|-id=060 bgcolor=#d6d6d6
| 148060 ||  || — || October 13, 1998 || Kitt Peak || Spacewatch || 3:2 || align=right | 4.7 km || 
|-id=061 bgcolor=#fefefe
| 148061 ||  || — || October 15, 1998 || Kitt Peak || Spacewatch || NYS || align=right data-sort-value="0.81" | 810 m || 
|-id=062 bgcolor=#fefefe
| 148062 ||  || — || October 22, 1998 || Caussols || ODAS || — || align=right | 1.2 km || 
|-id=063 bgcolor=#fefefe
| 148063 ||  || — || October 28, 1998 || Višnjan Observatory || K. Korlević || — || align=right | 1.4 km || 
|-id=064 bgcolor=#fefefe
| 148064 ||  || — || October 19, 1998 || Anderson Mesa || LONEOS || — || align=right | 1.3 km || 
|-id=065 bgcolor=#fefefe
| 148065 ||  || — || October 18, 1998 || La Silla || E. W. Elst || — || align=right | 1.7 km || 
|-id=066 bgcolor=#fefefe
| 148066 ||  || — || November 10, 1998 || Socorro || LINEAR || NYS || align=right | 1.3 km || 
|-id=067 bgcolor=#E9E9E9
| 148067 ||  || — || November 10, 1998 || Socorro || LINEAR || — || align=right | 1.9 km || 
|-id=068 bgcolor=#fefefe
| 148068 ||  || — || November 10, 1998 || Socorro || LINEAR || — || align=right | 1.5 km || 
|-id=069 bgcolor=#fefefe
| 148069 ||  || — || November 15, 1998 || Kitt Peak || Spacewatch || — || align=right | 1.4 km || 
|-id=070 bgcolor=#E9E9E9
| 148070 ||  || — || November 11, 1998 || Socorro || LINEAR || — || align=right | 1.4 km || 
|-id=071 bgcolor=#fefefe
| 148071 ||  || — || November 11, 1998 || Anderson Mesa || LONEOS || NYS || align=right | 1.6 km || 
|-id=072 bgcolor=#E9E9E9
| 148072 ||  || — || November 21, 1998 || Socorro || LINEAR || — || align=right | 1.8 km || 
|-id=073 bgcolor=#E9E9E9
| 148073 ||  || — || November 23, 1998 || Kitt Peak || Spacewatch || — || align=right | 2.1 km || 
|-id=074 bgcolor=#fefefe
| 148074 ||  || — || November 19, 1998 || Anderson Mesa || LONEOS || NYS || align=right | 1.1 km || 
|-id=075 bgcolor=#fefefe
| 148075 ||  || — || November 21, 1998 || Kitt Peak || Spacewatch || NYS || align=right | 1.1 km || 
|-id=076 bgcolor=#fefefe
| 148076 ||  || — || December 7, 1998 || Caussols || ODAS || EUT || align=right | 1.1 km || 
|-id=077 bgcolor=#fefefe
| 148077 ||  || — || December 8, 1998 || Caussols || ODAS || — || align=right | 1.3 km || 
|-id=078 bgcolor=#E9E9E9
| 148078 ||  || — || December 15, 1998 || Caussols || ODAS || — || align=right | 2.2 km || 
|-id=079 bgcolor=#E9E9E9
| 148079 ||  || — || January 8, 1999 || Kitt Peak || Spacewatch || — || align=right | 1.5 km || 
|-id=080 bgcolor=#E9E9E9
| 148080 ||  || — || January 11, 1999 || Kitt Peak || Spacewatch || — || align=right | 3.9 km || 
|-id=081 bgcolor=#fefefe
| 148081 Sunjiadong ||  ||  || January 11, 1999 || Xinglong || SCAP || — || align=right | 2.0 km || 
|-id=082 bgcolor=#E9E9E9
| 148082 ||  || — || January 26, 1999 || Višnjan Observatory || K. Korlević || — || align=right | 3.3 km || 
|-id=083 bgcolor=#fefefe
| 148083 ||  || — || February 12, 1999 || Socorro || LINEAR || H || align=right | 1.2 km || 
|-id=084 bgcolor=#E9E9E9
| 148084 ||  || — || February 10, 1999 || Socorro || LINEAR || — || align=right | 2.8 km || 
|-id=085 bgcolor=#E9E9E9
| 148085 ||  || — || February 10, 1999 || Socorro || LINEAR || — || align=right | 1.8 km || 
|-id=086 bgcolor=#E9E9E9
| 148086 ||  || — || February 10, 1999 || Socorro || LINEAR || — || align=right | 1.8 km || 
|-id=087 bgcolor=#E9E9E9
| 148087 ||  || — || February 10, 1999 || Socorro || LINEAR || — || align=right | 1.9 km || 
|-id=088 bgcolor=#E9E9E9
| 148088 ||  || — || February 10, 1999 || Socorro || LINEAR || — || align=right | 1.9 km || 
|-id=089 bgcolor=#E9E9E9
| 148089 ||  || — || February 12, 1999 || Socorro || LINEAR || — || align=right | 4.7 km || 
|-id=090 bgcolor=#E9E9E9
| 148090 ||  || — || February 11, 1999 || Socorro || LINEAR || — || align=right | 4.3 km || 
|-id=091 bgcolor=#E9E9E9
| 148091 ||  || — || February 13, 1999 || Kitt Peak || Spacewatch || — || align=right | 1.8 km || 
|-id=092 bgcolor=#E9E9E9
| 148092 ||  || — || March 19, 1999 || Kitt Peak || Spacewatch || — || align=right | 2.2 km || 
|-id=093 bgcolor=#d6d6d6
| 148093 ||  || — || March 19, 1999 || Socorro || LINEAR || — || align=right | 4.3 km || 
|-id=094 bgcolor=#fefefe
| 148094 ||  || — || April 15, 1999 || Wise || Wise Obs. || H || align=right | 1.0 km || 
|-id=095 bgcolor=#E9E9E9
| 148095 ||  || — || May 8, 1999 || Catalina || CSS || — || align=right | 3.2 km || 
|-id=096 bgcolor=#E9E9E9
| 148096 ||  || — || May 12, 1999 || Socorro || LINEAR || — || align=right | 2.5 km || 
|-id=097 bgcolor=#d6d6d6
| 148097 ||  || — || May 15, 1999 || Catalina || CSS || — || align=right | 5.0 km || 
|-id=098 bgcolor=#E9E9E9
| 148098 || 1999 KR || — || May 16, 1999 || Catalina || CSS || — || align=right | 4.6 km || 
|-id=099 bgcolor=#fefefe
| 148099 ||  || — || June 8, 1999 || Kitt Peak || Spacewatch || — || align=right | 1.1 km || 
|-id=100 bgcolor=#d6d6d6
| 148100 ||  || — || July 13, 1999 || Socorro || LINEAR || — || align=right | 4.7 km || 
|}

148101–148200 

|-bgcolor=#d6d6d6
| 148101 ||  || — || September 8, 1999 || Prescott || P. G. Comba || — || align=right | 5.8 km || 
|-id=102 bgcolor=#d6d6d6
| 148102 ||  || — || September 7, 1999 || Socorro || LINEAR || EUP || align=right | 5.5 km || 
|-id=103 bgcolor=#fefefe
| 148103 ||  || — || September 7, 1999 || Socorro || LINEAR || — || align=right | 1.5 km || 
|-id=104 bgcolor=#d6d6d6
| 148104 ||  || — || September 7, 1999 || Socorro || LINEAR || — || align=right | 4.6 km || 
|-id=105 bgcolor=#d6d6d6
| 148105 ||  || — || September 8, 1999 || Socorro || LINEAR || EOS || align=right | 4.0 km || 
|-id=106 bgcolor=#d6d6d6
| 148106 ||  || — || September 8, 1999 || Socorro || LINEAR || — || align=right | 4.0 km || 
|-id=107 bgcolor=#d6d6d6
| 148107 ||  || — || September 9, 1999 || Socorro || LINEAR || EOS || align=right | 4.1 km || 
|-id=108 bgcolor=#d6d6d6
| 148108 ||  || — || September 9, 1999 || Socorro || LINEAR || — || align=right | 3.7 km || 
|-id=109 bgcolor=#fefefe
| 148109 ||  || — || September 9, 1999 || Socorro || LINEAR || — || align=right | 1.3 km || 
|-id=110 bgcolor=#d6d6d6
| 148110 ||  || — || September 8, 1999 || Socorro || LINEAR || — || align=right | 6.6 km || 
|-id=111 bgcolor=#fefefe
| 148111 ||  || — || September 8, 1999 || Socorro || LINEAR || FLO || align=right | 1.3 km || 
|-id=112 bgcolor=#C2E0FF
| 148112 ||  || — || September 8, 1999 || Mauna Kea || C. Trujillo, D. C. Jewitt, J. X. Luu || cubewano (cold)critical || align=right | 168 km || 
|-id=113 bgcolor=#d6d6d6
| 148113 ||  || — || September 8, 1999 || Socorro || LINEAR || EOS || align=right | 3.6 km || 
|-id=114 bgcolor=#d6d6d6
| 148114 ||  || — || September 30, 1999 || Anderson Mesa || LONEOS || — || align=right | 7.2 km || 
|-id=115 bgcolor=#fefefe
| 148115 ||  || — || October 2, 1999 || Socorro || LINEAR || — || align=right | 1.1 km || 
|-id=116 bgcolor=#fefefe
| 148116 ||  || — || October 4, 1999 || Socorro || LINEAR || — || align=right | 1.5 km || 
|-id=117 bgcolor=#d6d6d6
| 148117 ||  || — || October 6, 1999 || Kitt Peak || Spacewatch || — || align=right | 4.3 km || 
|-id=118 bgcolor=#d6d6d6
| 148118 ||  || — || October 8, 1999 || Kitt Peak || Spacewatch || — || align=right | 3.4 km || 
|-id=119 bgcolor=#fefefe
| 148119 ||  || — || October 12, 1999 || Kitt Peak || Spacewatch || — || align=right data-sort-value="0.75" | 750 m || 
|-id=120 bgcolor=#fefefe
| 148120 ||  || — || October 14, 1999 || Kitt Peak || Spacewatch || — || align=right | 1.6 km || 
|-id=121 bgcolor=#fefefe
| 148121 ||  || — || October 2, 1999 || Socorro || LINEAR || FLO || align=right data-sort-value="0.99" | 990 m || 
|-id=122 bgcolor=#fefefe
| 148122 ||  || — || October 6, 1999 || Socorro || LINEAR || — || align=right | 1.1 km || 
|-id=123 bgcolor=#fefefe
| 148123 ||  || — || October 9, 1999 || Socorro || LINEAR || — || align=right | 1.0 km || 
|-id=124 bgcolor=#d6d6d6
| 148124 ||  || — || October 10, 1999 || Socorro || LINEAR || EOS || align=right | 4.2 km || 
|-id=125 bgcolor=#d6d6d6
| 148125 ||  || — || October 10, 1999 || Socorro || LINEAR || — || align=right | 5.1 km || 
|-id=126 bgcolor=#fefefe
| 148126 ||  || — || October 12, 1999 || Socorro || LINEAR || FLO || align=right data-sort-value="0.99" | 990 m || 
|-id=127 bgcolor=#d6d6d6
| 148127 ||  || — || October 12, 1999 || Socorro || LINEAR || EOS || align=right | 4.3 km || 
|-id=128 bgcolor=#fefefe
| 148128 ||  || — || October 12, 1999 || Socorro || LINEAR || FLO || align=right | 1.7 km || 
|-id=129 bgcolor=#fefefe
| 148129 ||  || — || October 12, 1999 || Socorro || LINEAR || — || align=right | 1.2 km || 
|-id=130 bgcolor=#d6d6d6
| 148130 ||  || — || October 13, 1999 || Socorro || LINEAR || — || align=right | 6.1 km || 
|-id=131 bgcolor=#d6d6d6
| 148131 ||  || — || October 9, 1999 || Catalina || CSS || — || align=right | 4.5 km || 
|-id=132 bgcolor=#d6d6d6
| 148132 ||  || — || October 9, 1999 || Socorro || LINEAR || HYG || align=right | 6.0 km || 
|-id=133 bgcolor=#d6d6d6
| 148133 ||  || — || October 9, 1999 || Socorro || LINEAR || — || align=right | 4.6 km || 
|-id=134 bgcolor=#fefefe
| 148134 ||  || — || October 3, 1999 || Socorro || LINEAR || — || align=right | 1.5 km || 
|-id=135 bgcolor=#fefefe
| 148135 ||  || — || October 3, 1999 || Socorro || LINEAR || — || align=right | 1.5 km || 
|-id=136 bgcolor=#fefefe
| 148136 ||  || — || October 10, 1999 || Socorro || LINEAR || — || align=right | 1.2 km || 
|-id=137 bgcolor=#d6d6d6
| 148137 ||  || — || October 7, 1999 || Catalina || CSS || — || align=right | 3.3 km || 
|-id=138 bgcolor=#d6d6d6
| 148138 ||  || — || October 8, 1999 || Catalina || CSS || — || align=right | 8.4 km || 
|-id=139 bgcolor=#fefefe
| 148139 ||  || — || November 4, 1999 || Socorro || LINEAR || — || align=right | 1.0 km || 
|-id=140 bgcolor=#d6d6d6
| 148140 ||  || — || November 9, 1999 || Socorro || LINEAR || — || align=right | 4.4 km || 
|-id=141 bgcolor=#fefefe
| 148141 ||  || — || November 9, 1999 || Socorro || LINEAR || FLO || align=right | 1.6 km || 
|-id=142 bgcolor=#d6d6d6
| 148142 ||  || — || November 10, 1999 || Kitt Peak || Spacewatch || THM || align=right | 4.1 km || 
|-id=143 bgcolor=#fefefe
| 148143 ||  || — || November 10, 1999 || Kitt Peak || Spacewatch || — || align=right data-sort-value="0.85" | 850 m || 
|-id=144 bgcolor=#fefefe
| 148144 ||  || — || November 12, 1999 || Socorro || LINEAR || MAS || align=right data-sort-value="0.74" | 740 m || 
|-id=145 bgcolor=#fefefe
| 148145 ||  || — || November 14, 1999 || Socorro || LINEAR || — || align=right | 1.1 km || 
|-id=146 bgcolor=#fefefe
| 148146 ||  || — || November 14, 1999 || Socorro || LINEAR || FLO || align=right | 1.1 km || 
|-id=147 bgcolor=#fefefe
| 148147 ||  || — || December 6, 1999 || Socorro || LINEAR || — || align=right | 1.0 km || 
|-id=148 bgcolor=#fefefe
| 148148 ||  || — || December 7, 1999 || Socorro || LINEAR || FLO || align=right | 1.0 km || 
|-id=149 bgcolor=#fefefe
| 148149 ||  || — || December 7, 1999 || Socorro || LINEAR || FLO || align=right | 1.2 km || 
|-id=150 bgcolor=#fefefe
| 148150 ||  || — || December 7, 1999 || Socorro || LINEAR || NYS || align=right data-sort-value="0.90" | 900 m || 
|-id=151 bgcolor=#fefefe
| 148151 ||  || — || December 5, 1999 || Catalina || CSS || — || align=right | 1.2 km || 
|-id=152 bgcolor=#fefefe
| 148152 ||  || — || December 12, 1999 || Socorro || LINEAR || — || align=right | 1.5 km || 
|-id=153 bgcolor=#fefefe
| 148153 ||  || — || December 12, 1999 || Socorro || LINEAR || — || align=right | 1.5 km || 
|-id=154 bgcolor=#fefefe
| 148154 ||  || — || December 12, 1999 || Socorro || LINEAR || — || align=right | 2.1 km || 
|-id=155 bgcolor=#fefefe
| 148155 ||  || — || December 8, 1999 || Socorro || LINEAR || — || align=right | 1.5 km || 
|-id=156 bgcolor=#fefefe
| 148156 ||  || — || December 8, 1999 || Socorro || LINEAR || — || align=right | 2.8 km || 
|-id=157 bgcolor=#fefefe
| 148157 ||  || — || December 13, 1999 || Socorro || LINEAR || PHO || align=right | 2.3 km || 
|-id=158 bgcolor=#fefefe
| 148158 ||  || — || December 7, 1999 || Socorro || LINEAR || FLO || align=right | 2.0 km || 
|-id=159 bgcolor=#fefefe
| 148159 ||  || — || December 7, 1999 || Socorro || LINEAR || — || align=right | 1.2 km || 
|-id=160 bgcolor=#fefefe
| 148160 ||  || — || December 8, 1999 || Socorro || LINEAR || FLO || align=right | 1.4 km || 
|-id=161 bgcolor=#fefefe
| 148161 ||  || — || December 10, 1999 || Socorro || LINEAR || — || align=right | 1.1 km || 
|-id=162 bgcolor=#fefefe
| 148162 ||  || — || December 12, 1999 || Socorro || LINEAR || V || align=right | 1.1 km || 
|-id=163 bgcolor=#fefefe
| 148163 ||  || — || December 12, 1999 || Socorro || LINEAR || FLO || align=right | 1.9 km || 
|-id=164 bgcolor=#fefefe
| 148164 ||  || — || December 12, 1999 || Socorro || LINEAR || FLO || align=right | 1.2 km || 
|-id=165 bgcolor=#fefefe
| 148165 ||  || — || December 14, 1999 || Kitt Peak || Spacewatch || FLO || align=right data-sort-value="0.99" | 990 m || 
|-id=166 bgcolor=#fefefe
| 148166 ||  || — || December 7, 1999 || Catalina || CSS || — || align=right | 1.2 km || 
|-id=167 bgcolor=#d6d6d6
| 148167 ||  || — || December 9, 1999 || Kitt Peak || Spacewatch || — || align=right | 6.0 km || 
|-id=168 bgcolor=#fefefe
| 148168 ||  || — || December 9, 1999 || Kitt Peak || Spacewatch || — || align=right | 1.6 km || 
|-id=169 bgcolor=#fefefe
| 148169 ||  || — || December 7, 1999 || Socorro || LINEAR || — || align=right | 1.5 km || 
|-id=170 bgcolor=#fefefe
| 148170 ||  || — || December 17, 1999 || Socorro || LINEAR || PHO || align=right | 7.1 km || 
|-id=171 bgcolor=#fefefe
| 148171 ||  || — || December 17, 1999 || Socorro || LINEAR || — || align=right | 1.7 km || 
|-id=172 bgcolor=#fefefe
| 148172 ||  || — || December 31, 1999 || Anderson Mesa || LONEOS || — || align=right | 1.7 km || 
|-id=173 bgcolor=#fefefe
| 148173 || 2000 AT || — || January 2, 2000 || Kitt Peak || Spacewatch || NYS || align=right | 1.5 km || 
|-id=174 bgcolor=#fefefe
| 148174 ||  || — || January 3, 2000 || Socorro || LINEAR || V || align=right | 1.2 km || 
|-id=175 bgcolor=#fefefe
| 148175 ||  || — || January 3, 2000 || Socorro || LINEAR || FLO || align=right | 1.2 km || 
|-id=176 bgcolor=#fefefe
| 148176 ||  || — || January 3, 2000 || Socorro || LINEAR || — || align=right | 1.1 km || 
|-id=177 bgcolor=#fefefe
| 148177 ||  || — || January 4, 2000 || Socorro || LINEAR || — || align=right | 1.4 km || 
|-id=178 bgcolor=#fefefe
| 148178 ||  || — || January 5, 2000 || Socorro || LINEAR || — || align=right | 1.4 km || 
|-id=179 bgcolor=#fefefe
| 148179 ||  || — || January 5, 2000 || Socorro || LINEAR || — || align=right | 1.2 km || 
|-id=180 bgcolor=#fefefe
| 148180 ||  || — || January 5, 2000 || Socorro || LINEAR || — || align=right | 2.3 km || 
|-id=181 bgcolor=#fefefe
| 148181 ||  || — || January 5, 2000 || Socorro || LINEAR || — || align=right | 1.5 km || 
|-id=182 bgcolor=#fefefe
| 148182 ||  || — || January 3, 2000 || Socorro || LINEAR || — || align=right | 1.9 km || 
|-id=183 bgcolor=#d6d6d6
| 148183 ||  || — || January 4, 2000 || Kitt Peak || Spacewatch || HYG || align=right | 5.6 km || 
|-id=184 bgcolor=#fefefe
| 148184 ||  || — || January 5, 2000 || Kitt Peak || Spacewatch || V || align=right | 1.6 km || 
|-id=185 bgcolor=#fefefe
| 148185 ||  || — || January 9, 2000 || Kitt Peak || Spacewatch || — || align=right | 1.1 km || 
|-id=186 bgcolor=#fefefe
| 148186 || 2000 BG || — || January 16, 2000 || Eskridge || G. Hug, G. Bell || MAS || align=right data-sort-value="0.91" | 910 m || 
|-id=187 bgcolor=#fefefe
| 148187 ||  || — || January 30, 2000 || Socorro || LINEAR || — || align=right | 1.6 km || 
|-id=188 bgcolor=#fefefe
| 148188 ||  || — || January 26, 2000 || Kitt Peak || Spacewatch || V || align=right | 1.1 km || 
|-id=189 bgcolor=#fefefe
| 148189 ||  || — || January 30, 2000 || Kitt Peak || Spacewatch || NYS || align=right | 1.0 km || 
|-id=190 bgcolor=#fefefe
| 148190 ||  || — || January 29, 2000 || Socorro || LINEAR || FLO || align=right | 1.5 km || 
|-id=191 bgcolor=#fefefe
| 148191 ||  || — || January 29, 2000 || Socorro || LINEAR || V || align=right | 1.1 km || 
|-id=192 bgcolor=#fefefe
| 148192 ||  || — || January 30, 2000 || Catalina || CSS || — || align=right | 1.7 km || 
|-id=193 bgcolor=#fefefe
| 148193 ||  || — || January 28, 2000 || Kitt Peak || Spacewatch || MAS || align=right data-sort-value="0.85" | 850 m || 
|-id=194 bgcolor=#fefefe
| 148194 ||  || — || January 28, 2000 || Kitt Peak || Spacewatch || — || align=right | 1.4 km || 
|-id=195 bgcolor=#fefefe
| 148195 ||  || — || February 2, 2000 || Socorro || LINEAR || — || align=right | 1.3 km || 
|-id=196 bgcolor=#fefefe
| 148196 ||  || — || February 3, 2000 || Socorro || LINEAR || — || align=right | 1.3 km || 
|-id=197 bgcolor=#fefefe
| 148197 ||  || — || February 3, 2000 || Socorro || LINEAR || — || align=right | 1.7 km || 
|-id=198 bgcolor=#fefefe
| 148198 ||  || — || February 3, 2000 || Socorro || LINEAR || — || align=right | 1.3 km || 
|-id=199 bgcolor=#fefefe
| 148199 ||  || — || February 4, 2000 || Socorro || LINEAR || — || align=right | 1.5 km || 
|-id=200 bgcolor=#fefefe
| 148200 ||  || — || February 1, 2000 || Kitt Peak || Spacewatch || — || align=right | 1.3 km || 
|}

148201–148300 

|-bgcolor=#fefefe
| 148201 ||  || — || February 8, 2000 || Kitt Peak || Spacewatch || — || align=right | 1.4 km || 
|-id=202 bgcolor=#fefefe
| 148202 ||  || — || February 6, 2000 || Socorro || LINEAR || — || align=right | 3.1 km || 
|-id=203 bgcolor=#E9E9E9
| 148203 ||  || — || February 4, 2000 || Socorro || LINEAR || — || align=right | 2.1 km || 
|-id=204 bgcolor=#fefefe
| 148204 ||  || — || February 6, 2000 || Socorro || LINEAR || NYS || align=right | 1.1 km || 
|-id=205 bgcolor=#fefefe
| 148205 ||  || — || February 8, 2000 || Socorro || LINEAR || ERI || align=right | 3.2 km || 
|-id=206 bgcolor=#fefefe
| 148206 ||  || — || February 13, 2000 || San Marcello || L. Tesi, M. Tombelli || FLO || align=right | 1.6 km || 
|-id=207 bgcolor=#fefefe
| 148207 ||  || — || February 10, 2000 || Kitt Peak || Spacewatch || NYS || align=right | 2.5 km || 
|-id=208 bgcolor=#fefefe
| 148208 ||  || — || February 12, 2000 || Kitt Peak || Spacewatch || — || align=right | 1.3 km || 
|-id=209 bgcolor=#C2E0FF
| 148209 ||  || — || February 6, 2000 || Kitt Peak || M. W. Buie || SDOcritical || align=right | 243 km || 
|-id=210 bgcolor=#fefefe
| 148210 ||  || — || February 6, 2000 || Catalina || CSS || NYS || align=right | 1.0 km || 
|-id=211 bgcolor=#fefefe
| 148211 ||  || — || February 3, 2000 || Socorro || LINEAR || — || align=right | 3.8 km || 
|-id=212 bgcolor=#fefefe
| 148212 ||  || — || February 6, 2000 || Kitt Peak || Spacewatch || — || align=right | 1.3 km || 
|-id=213 bgcolor=#fefefe
| 148213 ||  || — || February 27, 2000 || Kitt Peak || Spacewatch || — || align=right data-sort-value="0.96" | 960 m || 
|-id=214 bgcolor=#fefefe
| 148214 ||  || — || February 29, 2000 || Socorro || LINEAR || FLO || align=right | 1.1 km || 
|-id=215 bgcolor=#E9E9E9
| 148215 ||  || — || February 29, 2000 || Socorro || LINEAR || — || align=right | 2.2 km || 
|-id=216 bgcolor=#fefefe
| 148216 ||  || — || February 29, 2000 || Socorro || LINEAR || — || align=right | 1.8 km || 
|-id=217 bgcolor=#fefefe
| 148217 ||  || — || February 29, 2000 || Socorro || LINEAR || — || align=right data-sort-value="0.93" | 930 m || 
|-id=218 bgcolor=#E9E9E9
| 148218 ||  || — || February 29, 2000 || Socorro || LINEAR || — || align=right | 2.4 km || 
|-id=219 bgcolor=#fefefe
| 148219 ||  || — || February 29, 2000 || Socorro || LINEAR || ERI || align=right | 3.3 km || 
|-id=220 bgcolor=#fefefe
| 148220 ||  || — || February 29, 2000 || Socorro || LINEAR || NYS || align=right data-sort-value="0.91" | 910 m || 
|-id=221 bgcolor=#E9E9E9
| 148221 ||  || — || February 29, 2000 || Socorro || LINEAR || — || align=right | 1.5 km || 
|-id=222 bgcolor=#fefefe
| 148222 ||  || — || February 29, 2000 || Socorro || LINEAR || — || align=right | 1.5 km || 
|-id=223 bgcolor=#fefefe
| 148223 ||  || — || February 29, 2000 || Socorro || LINEAR || — || align=right | 1.3 km || 
|-id=224 bgcolor=#fefefe
| 148224 ||  || — || February 29, 2000 || Socorro || LINEAR || FLO || align=right | 1.3 km || 
|-id=225 bgcolor=#fefefe
| 148225 ||  || — || February 29, 2000 || Socorro || LINEAR || V || align=right | 1.1 km || 
|-id=226 bgcolor=#fefefe
| 148226 ||  || — || February 29, 2000 || Socorro || LINEAR || FLO || align=right | 1.9 km || 
|-id=227 bgcolor=#d6d6d6
| 148227 ||  || — || February 29, 2000 || Socorro || LINEAR || 3:2 || align=right | 7.9 km || 
|-id=228 bgcolor=#fefefe
| 148228 ||  || — || February 29, 2000 || Socorro || LINEAR || — || align=right | 1.5 km || 
|-id=229 bgcolor=#fefefe
| 148229 ||  || — || February 29, 2000 || Socorro || LINEAR || — || align=right | 1.4 km || 
|-id=230 bgcolor=#fefefe
| 148230 ||  || — || February 29, 2000 || Socorro || LINEAR || — || align=right | 1.3 km || 
|-id=231 bgcolor=#fefefe
| 148231 ||  || — || February 28, 2000 || Socorro || LINEAR || NYS || align=right | 1.2 km || 
|-id=232 bgcolor=#fefefe
| 148232 ||  || — || February 29, 2000 || Socorro || LINEAR || NYS || align=right data-sort-value="0.98" | 980 m || 
|-id=233 bgcolor=#fefefe
| 148233 ||  || — || February 29, 2000 || Socorro || LINEAR || ERI || align=right | 2.9 km || 
|-id=234 bgcolor=#d6d6d6
| 148234 ||  || — || March 2, 2000 || Kitt Peak || Spacewatch || SHU3:2 || align=right | 9.8 km || 
|-id=235 bgcolor=#fefefe
| 148235 ||  || — || March 2, 2000 || Kitt Peak || Spacewatch || MAS || align=right | 1.0 km || 
|-id=236 bgcolor=#fefefe
| 148236 ||  || — || March 3, 2000 || Socorro || LINEAR || — || align=right | 1.5 km || 
|-id=237 bgcolor=#fefefe
| 148237 ||  || — || March 3, 2000 || Socorro || LINEAR || EUT || align=right data-sort-value="0.91" | 910 m || 
|-id=238 bgcolor=#fefefe
| 148238 ||  || — || March 5, 2000 || Socorro || LINEAR || — || align=right | 1.7 km || 
|-id=239 bgcolor=#E9E9E9
| 148239 ||  || — || March 4, 2000 || Socorro || LINEAR || — || align=right | 2.0 km || 
|-id=240 bgcolor=#fefefe
| 148240 ||  || — || March 8, 2000 || Socorro || LINEAR || — || align=right | 1.9 km || 
|-id=241 bgcolor=#fefefe
| 148241 ||  || — || March 8, 2000 || Socorro || LINEAR || — || align=right | 1.4 km || 
|-id=242 bgcolor=#fefefe
| 148242 ||  || — || March 8, 2000 || Socorro || LINEAR || — || align=right | 1.4 km || 
|-id=243 bgcolor=#E9E9E9
| 148243 ||  || — || March 9, 2000 || Socorro || LINEAR || — || align=right | 1.9 km || 
|-id=244 bgcolor=#fefefe
| 148244 ||  || — || March 10, 2000 || Socorro || LINEAR || — || align=right | 1.3 km || 
|-id=245 bgcolor=#fefefe
| 148245 ||  || — || March 10, 2000 || Socorro || LINEAR || MAS || align=right | 1.3 km || 
|-id=246 bgcolor=#E9E9E9
| 148246 ||  || — || March 8, 2000 || Haleakala || NEAT || — || align=right | 3.2 km || 
|-id=247 bgcolor=#fefefe
| 148247 ||  || — || March 11, 2000 || Anderson Mesa || LONEOS || NYS || align=right | 2.8 km || 
|-id=248 bgcolor=#E9E9E9
| 148248 ||  || — || March 11, 2000 || Anderson Mesa || LONEOS || — || align=right | 2.5 km || 
|-id=249 bgcolor=#fefefe
| 148249 ||  || — || March 11, 2000 || Anderson Mesa || LONEOS || NYS || align=right | 1.1 km || 
|-id=250 bgcolor=#fefefe
| 148250 ||  || — || March 11, 2000 || Anderson Mesa || LONEOS || V || align=right | 1.1 km || 
|-id=251 bgcolor=#fefefe
| 148251 ||  || — || March 3, 2000 || Catalina || CSS || — || align=right | 1.5 km || 
|-id=252 bgcolor=#fefefe
| 148252 ||  || — || March 3, 2000 || Socorro || LINEAR || V || align=right | 1.3 km || 
|-id=253 bgcolor=#fefefe
| 148253 ||  || — || March 4, 2000 || Socorro || LINEAR || — || align=right | 1.6 km || 
|-id=254 bgcolor=#fefefe
| 148254 ||  || — || March 1, 2000 || Catalina || CSS || ERI || align=right | 2.7 km || 
|-id=255 bgcolor=#fefefe
| 148255 ||  || — || March 5, 2000 || Xinglong || SCAP || NYS || align=right | 1.00 km || 
|-id=256 bgcolor=#E9E9E9
| 148256 ||  || — || March 28, 2000 || Socorro || LINEAR || — || align=right | 2.0 km || 
|-id=257 bgcolor=#E9E9E9
| 148257 ||  || — || March 29, 2000 || Socorro || LINEAR || — || align=right | 2.4 km || 
|-id=258 bgcolor=#fefefe
| 148258 ||  || — || March 29, 2000 || Socorro || LINEAR || ERI || align=right | 2.7 km || 
|-id=259 bgcolor=#fefefe
| 148259 ||  || — || March 29, 2000 || Socorro || LINEAR || ERI || align=right | 4.1 km || 
|-id=260 bgcolor=#E9E9E9
| 148260 ||  || — || March 29, 2000 || Socorro || LINEAR || — || align=right | 2.0 km || 
|-id=261 bgcolor=#E9E9E9
| 148261 ||  || — || March 29, 2000 || Socorro || LINEAR || — || align=right | 4.8 km || 
|-id=262 bgcolor=#fefefe
| 148262 ||  || — || March 29, 2000 || Socorro || LINEAR || NYS || align=right | 1.2 km || 
|-id=263 bgcolor=#E9E9E9
| 148263 ||  || — || March 29, 2000 || Socorro || LINEAR || — || align=right | 3.0 km || 
|-id=264 bgcolor=#fefefe
| 148264 ||  || — || March 29, 2000 || Socorro || LINEAR || CIM || align=right | 3.4 km || 
|-id=265 bgcolor=#fefefe
| 148265 ||  || — || March 29, 2000 || Socorro || LINEAR || — || align=right | 1.7 km || 
|-id=266 bgcolor=#fefefe
| 148266 ||  || — || March 29, 2000 || Socorro || LINEAR || NYS || align=right | 1.2 km || 
|-id=267 bgcolor=#fefefe
| 148267 ||  || — || March 29, 2000 || Socorro || LINEAR || V || align=right | 1.3 km || 
|-id=268 bgcolor=#fefefe
| 148268 ||  || — || March 26, 2000 || Anderson Mesa || LONEOS || NYS || align=right | 1.2 km || 
|-id=269 bgcolor=#fefefe
| 148269 ||  || — || March 25, 2000 || Kitt Peak || Spacewatch || NYS || align=right data-sort-value="0.80" | 800 m || 
|-id=270 bgcolor=#fefefe
| 148270 ||  || — || April 4, 2000 || Socorro || LINEAR || — || align=right | 1.2 km || 
|-id=271 bgcolor=#fefefe
| 148271 ||  || — || April 5, 2000 || Socorro || LINEAR || — || align=right | 1.1 km || 
|-id=272 bgcolor=#fefefe
| 148272 ||  || — || April 5, 2000 || Socorro || LINEAR || V || align=right | 1.2 km || 
|-id=273 bgcolor=#fefefe
| 148273 ||  || — || April 5, 2000 || Socorro || LINEAR || NYS || align=right | 1.8 km || 
|-id=274 bgcolor=#fefefe
| 148274 ||  || — || April 5, 2000 || Socorro || LINEAR || NYS || align=right data-sort-value="0.90" | 900 m || 
|-id=275 bgcolor=#fefefe
| 148275 ||  || — || April 5, 2000 || Socorro || LINEAR || NYS || align=right | 1.3 km || 
|-id=276 bgcolor=#fefefe
| 148276 ||  || — || April 5, 2000 || Socorro || LINEAR || MAS || align=right | 1.4 km || 
|-id=277 bgcolor=#fefefe
| 148277 ||  || — || April 5, 2000 || Socorro || LINEAR || NYS || align=right | 1.1 km || 
|-id=278 bgcolor=#E9E9E9
| 148278 ||  || — || April 3, 2000 || Socorro || LINEAR || — || align=right | 1.4 km || 
|-id=279 bgcolor=#fefefe
| 148279 ||  || — || April 4, 2000 || Socorro || LINEAR || — || align=right | 2.0 km || 
|-id=280 bgcolor=#E9E9E9
| 148280 ||  || — || April 5, 2000 || Socorro || LINEAR || ADE || align=right | 4.8 km || 
|-id=281 bgcolor=#fefefe
| 148281 ||  || — || April 7, 2000 || Socorro || LINEAR || — || align=right | 1.3 km || 
|-id=282 bgcolor=#fefefe
| 148282 ||  || — || April 7, 2000 || Socorro || LINEAR || NYS || align=right | 1.4 km || 
|-id=283 bgcolor=#E9E9E9
| 148283 ||  || — || April 8, 2000 || Socorro || LINEAR || — || align=right | 1.9 km || 
|-id=284 bgcolor=#E9E9E9
| 148284 ||  || — || April 7, 2000 || Anderson Mesa || LONEOS || — || align=right | 1.4 km || 
|-id=285 bgcolor=#fefefe
| 148285 ||  || — || April 7, 2000 || Anderson Mesa || LONEOS || NYS || align=right | 1.1 km || 
|-id=286 bgcolor=#fefefe
| 148286 ||  || — || April 5, 2000 || Socorro || LINEAR || ERI || align=right | 2.3 km || 
|-id=287 bgcolor=#fefefe
| 148287 ||  || — || April 5, 2000 || Anderson Mesa || LONEOS || NYS || align=right | 2.8 km || 
|-id=288 bgcolor=#fefefe
| 148288 ||  || — || April 5, 2000 || Anderson Mesa || LONEOS || — || align=right | 1.2 km || 
|-id=289 bgcolor=#fefefe
| 148289 ||  || — || April 5, 2000 || Anderson Mesa || LONEOS || — || align=right | 1.4 km || 
|-id=290 bgcolor=#E9E9E9
| 148290 ||  || — || April 25, 2000 || Kitt Peak || Spacewatch || — || align=right | 2.1 km || 
|-id=291 bgcolor=#fefefe
| 148291 ||  || — || April 24, 2000 || Anderson Mesa || LONEOS || ERI || align=right | 3.3 km || 
|-id=292 bgcolor=#fefefe
| 148292 ||  || — || April 27, 2000 || Socorro || LINEAR || — || align=right | 1.6 km || 
|-id=293 bgcolor=#E9E9E9
| 148293 ||  || — || April 28, 2000 || Socorro || LINEAR || EUN || align=right | 2.2 km || 
|-id=294 bgcolor=#fefefe
| 148294 ||  || — || April 25, 2000 || Anderson Mesa || LONEOS || — || align=right | 1.6 km || 
|-id=295 bgcolor=#fefefe
| 148295 ||  || — || April 29, 2000 || Socorro || LINEAR || — || align=right | 1.3 km || 
|-id=296 bgcolor=#E9E9E9
| 148296 ||  || — || April 27, 2000 || Anderson Mesa || LONEOS || — || align=right | 1.9 km || 
|-id=297 bgcolor=#fefefe
| 148297 ||  || — || April 26, 2000 || Anderson Mesa || LONEOS || MAS || align=right | 1.2 km || 
|-id=298 bgcolor=#fefefe
| 148298 ||  || — || April 27, 2000 || Socorro || LINEAR || — || align=right | 1.6 km || 
|-id=299 bgcolor=#E9E9E9
| 148299 ||  || — || April 28, 2000 || Anderson Mesa || LONEOS || — || align=right | 3.6 km || 
|-id=300 bgcolor=#fefefe
| 148300 ||  || — || April 25, 2000 || Kitt Peak || Spacewatch || NYS || align=right | 1.3 km || 
|}

148301–148400 

|-bgcolor=#fefefe
| 148301 ||  || — || May 3, 2000 || Socorro || LINEAR || PHO || align=right | 1.6 km || 
|-id=302 bgcolor=#fefefe
| 148302 ||  || — || May 9, 2000 || Socorro || LINEAR || — || align=right | 3.1 km || 
|-id=303 bgcolor=#fefefe
| 148303 ||  || — || May 28, 2000 || Socorro || LINEAR || — || align=right | 1.4 km || 
|-id=304 bgcolor=#E9E9E9
| 148304 ||  || — || May 31, 2000 || Prescott || P. G. Comba || — || align=right | 1.5 km || 
|-id=305 bgcolor=#fefefe
| 148305 ||  || — || May 27, 2000 || Socorro || LINEAR || V || align=right | 1.6 km || 
|-id=306 bgcolor=#E9E9E9
| 148306 ||  || — || May 29, 2000 || Kitt Peak || Spacewatch || — || align=right | 2.0 km || 
|-id=307 bgcolor=#E9E9E9
| 148307 ||  || — || June 4, 2000 || Haleakala || NEAT || — || align=right | 4.8 km || 
|-id=308 bgcolor=#E9E9E9
| 148308 ||  || — || June 1, 2000 || Haleakala || NEAT || — || align=right | 1.9 km || 
|-id=309 bgcolor=#d6d6d6
| 148309 ||  || — || July 3, 2000 || Kitt Peak || Spacewatch || — || align=right | 2.7 km || 
|-id=310 bgcolor=#E9E9E9
| 148310 ||  || — || July 3, 2000 || Kitt Peak || Spacewatch || — || align=right | 3.9 km || 
|-id=311 bgcolor=#E9E9E9
| 148311 ||  || — || July 7, 2000 || Socorro || LINEAR || — || align=right | 2.9 km || 
|-id=312 bgcolor=#E9E9E9
| 148312 ||  || — || July 23, 2000 || Socorro || LINEAR || — || align=right | 5.4 km || 
|-id=313 bgcolor=#E9E9E9
| 148313 ||  || — || July 23, 2000 || Socorro || LINEAR || — || align=right | 3.5 km || 
|-id=314 bgcolor=#E9E9E9
| 148314 ||  || — || July 24, 2000 || Anderson Mesa || LONEOS || — || align=right | 3.9 km || 
|-id=315 bgcolor=#fefefe
| 148315 ||  || — || August 4, 2000 || Socorro || LINEAR || H || align=right | 1.2 km || 
|-id=316 bgcolor=#fefefe
| 148316 ||  || — || August 1, 2000 || Socorro || LINEAR || H || align=right | 1.1 km || 
|-id=317 bgcolor=#E9E9E9
| 148317 ||  || — || August 24, 2000 || Socorro || LINEAR || — || align=right | 4.1 km || 
|-id=318 bgcolor=#E9E9E9
| 148318 ||  || — || August 24, 2000 || Socorro || LINEAR || — || align=right | 4.8 km || 
|-id=319 bgcolor=#E9E9E9
| 148319 ||  || — || August 26, 2000 || Socorro || LINEAR || — || align=right | 4.9 km || 
|-id=320 bgcolor=#E9E9E9
| 148320 ||  || — || August 24, 2000 || Socorro || LINEAR || — || align=right | 3.7 km || 
|-id=321 bgcolor=#E9E9E9
| 148321 ||  || — || August 24, 2000 || Socorro || LINEAR || — || align=right | 1.8 km || 
|-id=322 bgcolor=#E9E9E9
| 148322 ||  || — || August 26, 2000 || Socorro || LINEAR || GEF || align=right | 2.2 km || 
|-id=323 bgcolor=#d6d6d6
| 148323 ||  || — || August 28, 2000 || Socorro || LINEAR || — || align=right | 3.5 km || 
|-id=324 bgcolor=#E9E9E9
| 148324 ||  || — || August 24, 2000 || Socorro || LINEAR || — || align=right | 2.5 km || 
|-id=325 bgcolor=#d6d6d6
| 148325 ||  || — || August 24, 2000 || Socorro || LINEAR || — || align=right | 3.6 km || 
|-id=326 bgcolor=#E9E9E9
| 148326 ||  || — || August 26, 2000 || Socorro || LINEAR || — || align=right | 4.1 km || 
|-id=327 bgcolor=#E9E9E9
| 148327 ||  || — || August 28, 2000 || Socorro || LINEAR || — || align=right | 3.0 km || 
|-id=328 bgcolor=#E9E9E9
| 148328 ||  || — || August 29, 2000 || Socorro || LINEAR || — || align=right | 2.8 km || 
|-id=329 bgcolor=#E9E9E9
| 148329 ||  || — || August 29, 2000 || Socorro || LINEAR || — || align=right | 5.3 km || 
|-id=330 bgcolor=#E9E9E9
| 148330 ||  || — || August 24, 2000 || Socorro || LINEAR || — || align=right | 4.0 km || 
|-id=331 bgcolor=#E9E9E9
| 148331 ||  || — || August 31, 2000 || Socorro || LINEAR || — || align=right | 2.8 km || 
|-id=332 bgcolor=#d6d6d6
| 148332 ||  || — || August 26, 2000 || Socorro || LINEAR || — || align=right | 5.7 km || 
|-id=333 bgcolor=#d6d6d6
| 148333 ||  || — || August 30, 2000 || Višnjan Observatory || K. Korlević || — || align=right | 4.9 km || 
|-id=334 bgcolor=#d6d6d6
| 148334 ||  || — || August 31, 2000 || Socorro || LINEAR || — || align=right | 5.1 km || 
|-id=335 bgcolor=#d6d6d6
| 148335 ||  || — || August 31, 2000 || Socorro || LINEAR || — || align=right | 4.3 km || 
|-id=336 bgcolor=#E9E9E9
| 148336 ||  || — || August 31, 2000 || Socorro || LINEAR || — || align=right | 3.9 km || 
|-id=337 bgcolor=#E9E9E9
| 148337 ||  || — || August 31, 2000 || Socorro || LINEAR || GEF || align=right | 2.3 km || 
|-id=338 bgcolor=#E9E9E9
| 148338 ||  || — || August 31, 2000 || Socorro || LINEAR || — || align=right | 3.6 km || 
|-id=339 bgcolor=#E9E9E9
| 148339 ||  || — || August 31, 2000 || Socorro || LINEAR || GEF || align=right | 2.2 km || 
|-id=340 bgcolor=#E9E9E9
| 148340 ||  || — || August 29, 2000 || Socorro || LINEAR || — || align=right | 3.4 km || 
|-id=341 bgcolor=#E9E9E9
| 148341 ||  || — || August 29, 2000 || Socorro || LINEAR || — || align=right | 3.2 km || 
|-id=342 bgcolor=#E9E9E9
| 148342 ||  || — || August 27, 2000 || Cerro Tololo || M. W. Buie || — || align=right | 3.2 km || 
|-id=343 bgcolor=#fefefe
| 148343 ||  || — || September 1, 2000 || Socorro || LINEAR || H || align=right | 1.3 km || 
|-id=344 bgcolor=#d6d6d6
| 148344 ||  || — || September 1, 2000 || Socorro || LINEAR || — || align=right | 8.6 km || 
|-id=345 bgcolor=#E9E9E9
| 148345 ||  || — || September 1, 2000 || Socorro || LINEAR || — || align=right | 5.1 km || 
|-id=346 bgcolor=#d6d6d6
| 148346 ||  || — || September 1, 2000 || Socorro || LINEAR || — || align=right | 5.1 km || 
|-id=347 bgcolor=#d6d6d6
| 148347 ||  || — || September 1, 2000 || Socorro || LINEAR || — || align=right | 6.2 km || 
|-id=348 bgcolor=#E9E9E9
| 148348 ||  || — || September 1, 2000 || Socorro || LINEAR || — || align=right | 3.4 km || 
|-id=349 bgcolor=#d6d6d6
| 148349 ||  || — || September 1, 2000 || Socorro || LINEAR || — || align=right | 3.2 km || 
|-id=350 bgcolor=#d6d6d6
| 148350 ||  || — || September 1, 2000 || Socorro || LINEAR || — || align=right | 3.9 km || 
|-id=351 bgcolor=#d6d6d6
| 148351 ||  || — || September 3, 2000 || Socorro || LINEAR || EUP || align=right | 11 km || 
|-id=352 bgcolor=#E9E9E9
| 148352 ||  || — || September 3, 2000 || Socorro || LINEAR || EUN || align=right | 2.7 km || 
|-id=353 bgcolor=#d6d6d6
| 148353 ||  || — || September 5, 2000 || Socorro || LINEAR || — || align=right | 4.2 km || 
|-id=354 bgcolor=#d6d6d6
| 148354 ||  || — || September 5, 2000 || Anderson Mesa || LONEOS || — || align=right | 6.4 km || 
|-id=355 bgcolor=#d6d6d6
| 148355 ||  || — || September 5, 2000 || Anderson Mesa || LONEOS || URS || align=right | 6.6 km || 
|-id=356 bgcolor=#fefefe
| 148356 ||  || — || September 23, 2000 || Socorro || LINEAR || H || align=right | 1.4 km || 
|-id=357 bgcolor=#d6d6d6
| 148357 ||  || — || September 23, 2000 || Socorro || LINEAR || — || align=right | 5.2 km || 
|-id=358 bgcolor=#E9E9E9
| 148358 ||  || — || September 23, 2000 || Socorro || LINEAR || — || align=right | 2.7 km || 
|-id=359 bgcolor=#d6d6d6
| 148359 ||  || — || September 23, 2000 || Socorro || LINEAR || — || align=right | 5.7 km || 
|-id=360 bgcolor=#d6d6d6
| 148360 ||  || — || September 23, 2000 || Socorro || LINEAR || — || align=right | 5.1 km || 
|-id=361 bgcolor=#d6d6d6
| 148361 ||  || — || September 24, 2000 || Socorro || LINEAR || — || align=right | 4.1 km || 
|-id=362 bgcolor=#d6d6d6
| 148362 ||  || — || September 22, 2000 || Socorro || LINEAR || — || align=right | 3.2 km || 
|-id=363 bgcolor=#d6d6d6
| 148363 ||  || — || September 22, 2000 || Socorro || LINEAR || TIR || align=right | 5.4 km || 
|-id=364 bgcolor=#E9E9E9
| 148364 ||  || — || September 23, 2000 || Socorro || LINEAR || — || align=right | 4.7 km || 
|-id=365 bgcolor=#E9E9E9
| 148365 ||  || — || September 23, 2000 || Socorro || LINEAR || ADE || align=right | 4.0 km || 
|-id=366 bgcolor=#d6d6d6
| 148366 ||  || — || September 23, 2000 || Socorro || LINEAR || — || align=right | 5.6 km || 
|-id=367 bgcolor=#d6d6d6
| 148367 ||  || — || September 24, 2000 || Socorro || LINEAR || K-2 || align=right | 2.1 km || 
|-id=368 bgcolor=#E9E9E9
| 148368 ||  || — || September 24, 2000 || Socorro || LINEAR || — || align=right | 3.5 km || 
|-id=369 bgcolor=#E9E9E9
| 148369 ||  || — || September 24, 2000 || Socorro || LINEAR || XIZ || align=right | 2.6 km || 
|-id=370 bgcolor=#d6d6d6
| 148370 ||  || — || September 24, 2000 || Socorro || LINEAR || EOS || align=right | 3.5 km || 
|-id=371 bgcolor=#d6d6d6
| 148371 ||  || — || September 22, 2000 || Socorro || LINEAR || — || align=right | 8.4 km || 
|-id=372 bgcolor=#d6d6d6
| 148372 ||  || — || September 23, 2000 || Socorro || LINEAR || — || align=right | 2.5 km || 
|-id=373 bgcolor=#d6d6d6
| 148373 ||  || — || September 23, 2000 || Socorro || LINEAR || — || align=right | 5.4 km || 
|-id=374 bgcolor=#E9E9E9
| 148374 ||  || — || September 28, 2000 || Socorro || LINEAR || — || align=right | 5.0 km || 
|-id=375 bgcolor=#d6d6d6
| 148375 ||  || — || September 20, 2000 || Haleakala || NEAT || — || align=right | 4.1 km || 
|-id=376 bgcolor=#d6d6d6
| 148376 ||  || — || September 24, 2000 || Socorro || LINEAR || THM || align=right | 3.6 km || 
|-id=377 bgcolor=#d6d6d6
| 148377 ||  || — || September 23, 2000 || Socorro || LINEAR || — || align=right | 3.5 km || 
|-id=378 bgcolor=#d6d6d6
| 148378 ||  || — || September 23, 2000 || Socorro || LINEAR || ELF || align=right | 5.4 km || 
|-id=379 bgcolor=#d6d6d6
| 148379 ||  || — || September 27, 2000 || Socorro || LINEAR || — || align=right | 4.4 km || 
|-id=380 bgcolor=#d6d6d6
| 148380 ||  || — || September 30, 2000 || Socorro || LINEAR || TEL || align=right | 2.4 km || 
|-id=381 bgcolor=#d6d6d6
| 148381 ||  || — || September 30, 2000 || Socorro || LINEAR || — || align=right | 4.1 km || 
|-id=382 bgcolor=#d6d6d6
| 148382 ||  || — || September 26, 2000 || Socorro || LINEAR || — || align=right | 8.6 km || 
|-id=383 bgcolor=#E9E9E9
| 148383 ||  || — || September 26, 2000 || Anderson Mesa || LONEOS || — || align=right | 3.4 km || 
|-id=384 bgcolor=#d6d6d6
| 148384 Dalcanton ||  ||  || September 26, 2000 || Apache Point || SDSS || VER || align=right | 4.2 km || 
|-id=385 bgcolor=#d6d6d6
| 148385 ||  || — || October 1, 2000 || Socorro || LINEAR || — || align=right | 3.5 km || 
|-id=386 bgcolor=#d6d6d6
| 148386 ||  || — || October 1, 2000 || Socorro || LINEAR || — || align=right | 3.8 km || 
|-id=387 bgcolor=#d6d6d6
| 148387 ||  || — || October 4, 2000 || Socorro || LINEAR || — || align=right | 3.7 km || 
|-id=388 bgcolor=#d6d6d6
| 148388 ||  || — || October 1, 2000 || Socorro || LINEAR || — || align=right | 3.8 km || 
|-id=389 bgcolor=#d6d6d6
| 148389 ||  || — || October 6, 2000 || Anderson Mesa || LONEOS || — || align=right | 3.0 km || 
|-id=390 bgcolor=#E9E9E9
| 148390 ||  || — || October 1, 2000 || Socorro || LINEAR || EUN || align=right | 2.9 km || 
|-id=391 bgcolor=#d6d6d6
| 148391 ||  || — || October 2, 2000 || Anderson Mesa || LONEOS || — || align=right | 4.4 km || 
|-id=392 bgcolor=#d6d6d6
| 148392 ||  || — || October 5, 2000 || Socorro || LINEAR || FIR || align=right | 5.4 km || 
|-id=393 bgcolor=#d6d6d6
| 148393 ||  || — || October 25, 2000 || Socorro || LINEAR || — || align=right | 5.0 km || 
|-id=394 bgcolor=#d6d6d6
| 148394 ||  || — || October 24, 2000 || Socorro || LINEAR || — || align=right | 5.4 km || 
|-id=395 bgcolor=#d6d6d6
| 148395 ||  || — || October 24, 2000 || Socorro || LINEAR || — || align=right | 4.7 km || 
|-id=396 bgcolor=#d6d6d6
| 148396 ||  || — || October 24, 2000 || Socorro || LINEAR || — || align=right | 5.0 km || 
|-id=397 bgcolor=#d6d6d6
| 148397 ||  || — || October 24, 2000 || Socorro || LINEAR || — || align=right | 6.2 km || 
|-id=398 bgcolor=#d6d6d6
| 148398 ||  || — || October 25, 2000 || Socorro || LINEAR || EOS || align=right | 3.1 km || 
|-id=399 bgcolor=#d6d6d6
| 148399 ||  || — || October 24, 2000 || Socorro || LINEAR || — || align=right | 6.1 km || 
|-id=400 bgcolor=#d6d6d6
| 148400 ||  || — || October 24, 2000 || Socorro || LINEAR || — || align=right | 4.6 km || 
|}

148401–148500 

|-bgcolor=#d6d6d6
| 148401 ||  || — || October 25, 2000 || Socorro || LINEAR || EOS || align=right | 3.8 km || 
|-id=402 bgcolor=#d6d6d6
| 148402 ||  || — || October 25, 2000 || Socorro || LINEAR || HYG || align=right | 4.8 km || 
|-id=403 bgcolor=#d6d6d6
| 148403 ||  || — || October 25, 2000 || Socorro || LINEAR || — || align=right | 4.3 km || 
|-id=404 bgcolor=#d6d6d6
| 148404 ||  || — || November 1, 2000 || Socorro || LINEAR || — || align=right | 4.0 km || 
|-id=405 bgcolor=#d6d6d6
| 148405 ||  || — || November 1, 2000 || Socorro || LINEAR || — || align=right | 3.8 km || 
|-id=406 bgcolor=#d6d6d6
| 148406 ||  || — || November 3, 2000 || Socorro || LINEAR || — || align=right | 4.0 km || 
|-id=407 bgcolor=#d6d6d6
| 148407 ||  || — || November 20, 2000 || Socorro || LINEAR || — || align=right | 4.8 km || 
|-id=408 bgcolor=#d6d6d6
| 148408 ||  || — || November 19, 2000 || Socorro || LINEAR || — || align=right | 4.6 km || 
|-id=409 bgcolor=#d6d6d6
| 148409 ||  || — || November 25, 2000 || Kitt Peak || Spacewatch || THM || align=right | 3.7 km || 
|-id=410 bgcolor=#d6d6d6
| 148410 ||  || — || November 20, 2000 || Socorro || LINEAR || — || align=right | 7.5 km || 
|-id=411 bgcolor=#d6d6d6
| 148411 ||  || — || November 21, 2000 || Socorro || LINEAR || — || align=right | 5.2 km || 
|-id=412 bgcolor=#d6d6d6
| 148412 ||  || — || November 21, 2000 || Socorro || LINEAR || — || align=right | 3.5 km || 
|-id=413 bgcolor=#d6d6d6
| 148413 ||  || — || November 26, 2000 || Desert Beaver || W. K. Y. Yeung || — || align=right | 5.6 km || 
|-id=414 bgcolor=#d6d6d6
| 148414 ||  || — || November 19, 2000 || Socorro || LINEAR || — || align=right | 4.8 km || 
|-id=415 bgcolor=#d6d6d6
| 148415 ||  || — || November 20, 2000 || Socorro || LINEAR || — || align=right | 5.5 km || 
|-id=416 bgcolor=#d6d6d6
| 148416 ||  || — || November 20, 2000 || Socorro || LINEAR || — || align=right | 5.7 km || 
|-id=417 bgcolor=#d6d6d6
| 148417 ||  || — || November 20, 2000 || Socorro || LINEAR || — || align=right | 5.6 km || 
|-id=418 bgcolor=#d6d6d6
| 148418 ||  || — || November 20, 2000 || Socorro || LINEAR || HYG || align=right | 7.1 km || 
|-id=419 bgcolor=#d6d6d6
| 148419 ||  || — || November 20, 2000 || Socorro || LINEAR || — || align=right | 5.0 km || 
|-id=420 bgcolor=#d6d6d6
| 148420 ||  || — || November 21, 2000 || Socorro || LINEAR || — || align=right | 6.1 km || 
|-id=421 bgcolor=#fefefe
| 148421 ||  || — || November 20, 2000 || Socorro || LINEAR || — || align=right | 1.2 km || 
|-id=422 bgcolor=#d6d6d6
| 148422 ||  || — || November 20, 2000 || Socorro || LINEAR || EOS || align=right | 4.0 km || 
|-id=423 bgcolor=#d6d6d6
| 148423 ||  || — || November 20, 2000 || Socorro || LINEAR || ALA || align=right | 6.0 km || 
|-id=424 bgcolor=#d6d6d6
| 148424 ||  || — || November 20, 2000 || Socorro || LINEAR || — || align=right | 6.5 km || 
|-id=425 bgcolor=#d6d6d6
| 148425 ||  || — || November 20, 2000 || Socorro || LINEAR || HYG || align=right | 5.6 km || 
|-id=426 bgcolor=#d6d6d6
| 148426 ||  || — || November 30, 2000 || Socorro || LINEAR || — || align=right | 3.0 km || 
|-id=427 bgcolor=#d6d6d6
| 148427 ||  || — || November 19, 2000 || Socorro || LINEAR || — || align=right | 6.5 km || 
|-id=428 bgcolor=#d6d6d6
| 148428 ||  || — || November 20, 2000 || Anderson Mesa || LONEOS || — || align=right | 7.5 km || 
|-id=429 bgcolor=#d6d6d6
| 148429 ||  || — || November 23, 2000 || Haleakala || NEAT || — || align=right | 4.4 km || 
|-id=430 bgcolor=#d6d6d6
| 148430 ||  || — || November 25, 2000 || Socorro || LINEAR || — || align=right | 7.2 km || 
|-id=431 bgcolor=#d6d6d6
| 148431 ||  || — || November 24, 2000 || Anderson Mesa || LONEOS || — || align=right | 3.9 km || 
|-id=432 bgcolor=#d6d6d6
| 148432 ||  || — || November 27, 2000 || Socorro || LINEAR || KOR || align=right | 2.4 km || 
|-id=433 bgcolor=#FA8072
| 148433 || 2000 XW || — || December 1, 2000 || Haleakala || NEAT || — || align=right | 1.6 km || 
|-id=434 bgcolor=#d6d6d6
| 148434 ||  || — || December 1, 2000 || Socorro || LINEAR || — || align=right | 4.6 km || 
|-id=435 bgcolor=#d6d6d6
| 148435 ||  || — || December 1, 2000 || Socorro || LINEAR || — || align=right | 5.8 km || 
|-id=436 bgcolor=#d6d6d6
| 148436 ||  || — || December 1, 2000 || Socorro || LINEAR || — || align=right | 3.9 km || 
|-id=437 bgcolor=#d6d6d6
| 148437 ||  || — || December 4, 2000 || Kitt Peak || Spacewatch || Tj (2.96) || align=right | 7.5 km || 
|-id=438 bgcolor=#d6d6d6
| 148438 ||  || — || December 4, 2000 || Socorro || LINEAR || — || align=right | 6.2 km || 
|-id=439 bgcolor=#d6d6d6
| 148439 ||  || — || December 4, 2000 || Socorro || LINEAR || — || align=right | 3.5 km || 
|-id=440 bgcolor=#d6d6d6
| 148440 ||  || — || December 4, 2000 || Socorro || LINEAR || — || align=right | 7.7 km || 
|-id=441 bgcolor=#d6d6d6
| 148441 ||  || — || December 4, 2000 || Socorro || LINEAR || — || align=right | 7.1 km || 
|-id=442 bgcolor=#d6d6d6
| 148442 ||  || — || December 4, 2000 || Socorro || LINEAR || — || align=right | 5.3 km || 
|-id=443 bgcolor=#d6d6d6
| 148443 ||  || — || December 5, 2000 || Socorro || LINEAR || — || align=right | 5.0 km || 
|-id=444 bgcolor=#d6d6d6
| 148444 ||  || — || December 5, 2000 || Socorro || LINEAR || — || align=right | 6.9 km || 
|-id=445 bgcolor=#fefefe
| 148445 ||  || — || December 6, 2000 || Socorro || LINEAR || — || align=right | 1.1 km || 
|-id=446 bgcolor=#d6d6d6
| 148446 ||  || — || December 3, 2000 || Kitt Peak || Spacewatch || HYG || align=right | 4.7 km || 
|-id=447 bgcolor=#d6d6d6
| 148447 || 2000 YH || — || December 16, 2000 || Socorro || LINEAR || EUP || align=right | 7.6 km || 
|-id=448 bgcolor=#d6d6d6
| 148448 ||  || — || December 17, 2000 || Gnosca || S. Sposetti || — || align=right | 6.9 km || 
|-id=449 bgcolor=#d6d6d6
| 148449 ||  || — || December 19, 2000 || Socorro || LINEAR || — || align=right | 4.6 km || 
|-id=450 bgcolor=#d6d6d6
| 148450 ||  || — || December 30, 2000 || Socorro || LINEAR || TIR || align=right | 4.0 km || 
|-id=451 bgcolor=#d6d6d6
| 148451 ||  || — || December 30, 2000 || Socorro || LINEAR || — || align=right | 5.7 km || 
|-id=452 bgcolor=#d6d6d6
| 148452 ||  || — || December 30, 2000 || Socorro || LINEAR || — || align=right | 4.1 km || 
|-id=453 bgcolor=#d6d6d6
| 148453 ||  || — || December 22, 2000 || Socorro || LINEAR || EUP || align=right | 8.2 km || 
|-id=454 bgcolor=#d6d6d6
| 148454 ||  || — || December 30, 2000 || Socorro || LINEAR || — || align=right | 4.1 km || 
|-id=455 bgcolor=#d6d6d6
| 148455 ||  || — || December 30, 2000 || Socorro || LINEAR || — || align=right | 7.2 km || 
|-id=456 bgcolor=#d6d6d6
| 148456 ||  || — || December 30, 2000 || Socorro || LINEAR || LIX || align=right | 6.3 km || 
|-id=457 bgcolor=#d6d6d6
| 148457 ||  || — || December 30, 2000 || Socorro || LINEAR || — || align=right | 5.2 km || 
|-id=458 bgcolor=#d6d6d6
| 148458 ||  || — || December 30, 2000 || Socorro || LINEAR || THM || align=right | 3.9 km || 
|-id=459 bgcolor=#d6d6d6
| 148459 ||  || — || December 30, 2000 || Socorro || LINEAR || URS || align=right | 7.6 km || 
|-id=460 bgcolor=#d6d6d6
| 148460 ||  || — || December 30, 2000 || Socorro || LINEAR || — || align=right | 7.7 km || 
|-id=461 bgcolor=#d6d6d6
| 148461 ||  || — || December 30, 2000 || Socorro || LINEAR || — || align=right | 6.8 km || 
|-id=462 bgcolor=#d6d6d6
| 148462 ||  || — || December 23, 2000 || Socorro || LINEAR || TIR || align=right | 5.0 km || 
|-id=463 bgcolor=#d6d6d6
| 148463 ||  || — || January 2, 2001 || Socorro || LINEAR || — || align=right | 5.6 km || 
|-id=464 bgcolor=#d6d6d6
| 148464 ||  || — || January 2, 2001 || Socorro || LINEAR || — || align=right | 7.5 km || 
|-id=465 bgcolor=#d6d6d6
| 148465 ||  || — || January 2, 2001 || Anderson Mesa || LONEOS || EUP || align=right | 9.9 km || 
|-id=466 bgcolor=#d6d6d6
| 148466 ||  || — || January 19, 2001 || Socorro || LINEAR || — || align=right | 5.5 km || 
|-id=467 bgcolor=#fefefe
| 148467 ||  || — || January 31, 2001 || Socorro || LINEAR || — || align=right | 1.3 km || 
|-id=468 bgcolor=#d6d6d6
| 148468 ||  || — || February 1, 2001 || Socorro || LINEAR || TIR || align=right | 8.6 km || 
|-id=469 bgcolor=#fefefe
| 148469 ||  || — || February 17, 2001 || Socorro || LINEAR || NYS || align=right | 1.1 km || 
|-id=470 bgcolor=#fefefe
| 148470 ||  || — || February 19, 2001 || Socorro || LINEAR || — || align=right | 1.2 km || 
|-id=471 bgcolor=#fefefe
| 148471 ||  || — || February 16, 2001 || Kitt Peak || Spacewatch || MAS || align=right data-sort-value="0.85" | 850 m || 
|-id=472 bgcolor=#fefefe
| 148472 ||  || — || February 27, 2001 || Kitt Peak || Spacewatch || — || align=right | 1.0 km || 
|-id=473 bgcolor=#fefefe
| 148473 ||  || — || March 2, 2001 || Anderson Mesa || LONEOS || — || align=right | 1.1 km || 
|-id=474 bgcolor=#fefefe
| 148474 ||  || — || March 2, 2001 || Anderson Mesa || LONEOS || — || align=right | 1.3 km || 
|-id=475 bgcolor=#fefefe
| 148475 ||  || — || March 15, 2001 || Needville || L. Casady, A. Cruz || NYS || align=right | 1.1 km || 
|-id=476 bgcolor=#fefefe
| 148476 ||  || — || March 19, 2001 || Socorro || LINEAR || NYS || align=right | 1.2 km || 
|-id=477 bgcolor=#fefefe
| 148477 ||  || — || March 16, 2001 || Kitt Peak || Spacewatch || NYS || align=right data-sort-value="0.88" | 880 m || 
|-id=478 bgcolor=#fefefe
| 148478 ||  || — || March 18, 2001 || Socorro || LINEAR || — || align=right | 1.3 km || 
|-id=479 bgcolor=#fefefe
| 148479 ||  || — || March 27, 2001 || Anderson Mesa || LONEOS || — || align=right | 1.2 km || 
|-id=480 bgcolor=#FA8072
| 148480 ||  || — || March 26, 2001 || Socorro || LINEAR || — || align=right | 1.1 km || 
|-id=481 bgcolor=#fefefe
| 148481 ||  || — || March 29, 2001 || Haleakala || NEAT || — || align=right | 1.2 km || 
|-id=482 bgcolor=#fefefe
| 148482 ||  || — || April 23, 2001 || Socorro || LINEAR || — || align=right | 1.5 km || 
|-id=483 bgcolor=#fefefe
| 148483 ||  || — || April 24, 2001 || Socorro || LINEAR || — || align=right | 1.5 km || 
|-id=484 bgcolor=#fefefe
| 148484 ||  || — || April 24, 2001 || Anderson Mesa || LONEOS || — || align=right | 5.0 km || 
|-id=485 bgcolor=#E9E9E9
| 148485 || 2001 JW || — || May 12, 2001 || Eskridge || G. Hug || — || align=right | 2.3 km || 
|-id=486 bgcolor=#fefefe
| 148486 ||  || — || May 15, 2001 || Haleakala || NEAT || FLO || align=right | 1.2 km || 
|-id=487 bgcolor=#fefefe
| 148487 ||  || — || May 18, 2001 || Socorro || LINEAR || — || align=right | 1.6 km || 
|-id=488 bgcolor=#fefefe
| 148488 ||  || — || May 17, 2001 || Socorro || LINEAR || — || align=right | 1.3 km || 
|-id=489 bgcolor=#fefefe
| 148489 ||  || — || May 17, 2001 || Socorro || LINEAR || EUT || align=right | 1.2 km || 
|-id=490 bgcolor=#fefefe
| 148490 ||  || — || May 21, 2001 || Socorro || LINEAR || NYS || align=right | 1.1 km || 
|-id=491 bgcolor=#fefefe
| 148491 ||  || — || May 24, 2001 || Socorro || LINEAR || — || align=right | 1.4 km || 
|-id=492 bgcolor=#fefefe
| 148492 ||  || — || May 21, 2001 || Socorro || LINEAR || — || align=right | 1.2 km || 
|-id=493 bgcolor=#E9E9E9
| 148493 ||  || — || May 18, 2001 || Socorro || LINEAR || — || align=right | 1.6 km || 
|-id=494 bgcolor=#fefefe
| 148494 ||  || — || May 24, 2001 || Anderson Mesa || LONEOS || FLO || align=right | 1.1 km || 
|-id=495 bgcolor=#fefefe
| 148495 ||  || — || June 14, 2001 || Palomar || NEAT || PHO || align=right | 4.5 km || 
|-id=496 bgcolor=#fefefe
| 148496 ||  || — || June 15, 2001 || Palomar || NEAT || V || align=right | 1.3 km || 
|-id=497 bgcolor=#fefefe
| 148497 ||  || — || June 20, 2001 || Palomar || NEAT || V || align=right data-sort-value="0.95" | 950 m || 
|-id=498 bgcolor=#fefefe
| 148498 ||  || — || June 21, 2001 || Palomar || NEAT || NYS || align=right | 1.3 km || 
|-id=499 bgcolor=#fefefe
| 148499 ||  || — || June 28, 2001 || Anderson Mesa || LONEOS || — || align=right | 1.8 km || 
|-id=500 bgcolor=#E9E9E9
| 148500 ||  || — || June 25, 2001 || Palomar || NEAT || — || align=right | 2.3 km || 
|}

148501–148600 

|-bgcolor=#fefefe
| 148501 ||  || — || June 22, 2001 || Palomar || NEAT || — || align=right | 1.7 km || 
|-id=502 bgcolor=#fefefe
| 148502 ||  || — || June 26, 2001 || Palomar || NEAT || — || align=right | 1.5 km || 
|-id=503 bgcolor=#fefefe
| 148503 || 2001 NQ || — || July 10, 2001 || Palomar || NEAT || — || align=right | 2.0 km || 
|-id=504 bgcolor=#E9E9E9
| 148504 ||  || — || July 10, 2001 || Socorro || LINEAR || — || align=right | 2.2 km || 
|-id=505 bgcolor=#fefefe
| 148505 ||  || — || July 14, 2001 || Palomar || NEAT || — || align=right | 1.4 km || 
|-id=506 bgcolor=#E9E9E9
| 148506 ||  || — || July 17, 2001 || Anderson Mesa || LONEOS || — || align=right | 2.4 km || 
|-id=507 bgcolor=#E9E9E9
| 148507 ||  || — || July 23, 2001 || Palomar || NEAT || — || align=right | 1.9 km || 
|-id=508 bgcolor=#fefefe
| 148508 ||  || — || July 16, 2001 || Anderson Mesa || LONEOS || FLO || align=right | 1.3 km || 
|-id=509 bgcolor=#fefefe
| 148509 ||  || — || July 20, 2001 || Socorro || LINEAR || — || align=right | 1.7 km || 
|-id=510 bgcolor=#fefefe
| 148510 ||  || — || July 21, 2001 || Haleakala || NEAT || — || align=right | 1.8 km || 
|-id=511 bgcolor=#E9E9E9
| 148511 ||  || — || July 27, 2001 || Palomar || NEAT || ADE || align=right | 4.4 km || 
|-id=512 bgcolor=#E9E9E9
| 148512 ||  || — || July 19, 2001 || Anderson Mesa || LONEOS || — || align=right | 3.7 km || 
|-id=513 bgcolor=#E9E9E9
| 148513 ||  || — || July 22, 2001 || Siding Spring || R. H. McNaught || — || align=right | 3.0 km || 
|-id=514 bgcolor=#E9E9E9
| 148514 ||  || — || August 10, 2001 || Haleakala || NEAT || — || align=right | 1.9 km || 
|-id=515 bgcolor=#fefefe
| 148515 ||  || — || August 11, 2001 || Haleakala || NEAT || — || align=right | 2.1 km || 
|-id=516 bgcolor=#E9E9E9
| 148516 ||  || — || August 8, 2001 || Haleakala || NEAT || — || align=right | 2.0 km || 
|-id=517 bgcolor=#E9E9E9
| 148517 ||  || — || August 11, 2001 || Haleakala || NEAT || — || align=right | 1.9 km || 
|-id=518 bgcolor=#fefefe
| 148518 ||  || — || August 13, 2001 || Kvistaberg || UDAS || — || align=right | 1.5 km || 
|-id=519 bgcolor=#E9E9E9
| 148519 ||  || — || August 11, 2001 || Palomar || NEAT || EUN || align=right | 2.4 km || 
|-id=520 bgcolor=#E9E9E9
| 148520 ||  || — || August 11, 2001 || Palomar || NEAT || EUN || align=right | 1.9 km || 
|-id=521 bgcolor=#E9E9E9
| 148521 ||  || — || August 12, 2001 || Palomar || NEAT || — || align=right | 1.5 km || 
|-id=522 bgcolor=#E9E9E9
| 148522 ||  || — || August 14, 2001 || Palomar || NEAT || HNS || align=right | 2.8 km || 
|-id=523 bgcolor=#fefefe
| 148523 ||  || — || August 14, 2001 || Haleakala || NEAT || — || align=right | 1.4 km || 
|-id=524 bgcolor=#E9E9E9
| 148524 ||  || — || August 14, 2001 || Haleakala || NEAT || — || align=right | 1.8 km || 
|-id=525 bgcolor=#fefefe
| 148525 || 2001 QG || — || August 16, 2001 || San Marcello || A. Boattini, M. Tombelli || MAS || align=right | 1.3 km || 
|-id=526 bgcolor=#fefefe
| 148526 || 2001 QV || — || August 16, 2001 || Socorro || LINEAR || CLA || align=right | 2.8 km || 
|-id=527 bgcolor=#E9E9E9
| 148527 ||  || — || August 16, 2001 || Socorro || LINEAR || — || align=right | 2.6 km || 
|-id=528 bgcolor=#E9E9E9
| 148528 ||  || — || August 16, 2001 || Socorro || LINEAR || — || align=right | 1.6 km || 
|-id=529 bgcolor=#fefefe
| 148529 ||  || — || August 16, 2001 || Socorro || LINEAR || MAS || align=right | 1.3 km || 
|-id=530 bgcolor=#E9E9E9
| 148530 ||  || — || August 16, 2001 || Socorro || LINEAR || GER || align=right | 2.8 km || 
|-id=531 bgcolor=#E9E9E9
| 148531 ||  || — || August 16, 2001 || Socorro || LINEAR || — || align=right | 3.2 km || 
|-id=532 bgcolor=#E9E9E9
| 148532 ||  || — || August 17, 2001 || Socorro || LINEAR || — || align=right | 2.7 km || 
|-id=533 bgcolor=#E9E9E9
| 148533 ||  || — || August 17, 2001 || Palomar || NEAT || — || align=right | 1.4 km || 
|-id=534 bgcolor=#fefefe
| 148534 ||  || — || August 16, 2001 || Socorro || LINEAR || NYS || align=right | 1.3 km || 
|-id=535 bgcolor=#fefefe
| 148535 ||  || — || August 16, 2001 || Socorro || LINEAR || NYS || align=right | 3.8 km || 
|-id=536 bgcolor=#E9E9E9
| 148536 ||  || — || August 17, 2001 || Socorro || LINEAR || — || align=right | 3.1 km || 
|-id=537 bgcolor=#fefefe
| 148537 ||  || — || August 16, 2001 || Socorro || LINEAR || V || align=right | 1.1 km || 
|-id=538 bgcolor=#E9E9E9
| 148538 ||  || — || August 17, 2001 || Socorro || LINEAR || — || align=right | 3.2 km || 
|-id=539 bgcolor=#fefefe
| 148539 ||  || — || August 19, 2001 || Socorro || LINEAR || — || align=right | 1.5 km || 
|-id=540 bgcolor=#fefefe
| 148540 ||  || — || August 19, 2001 || Socorro || LINEAR || V || align=right | 1.3 km || 
|-id=541 bgcolor=#E9E9E9
| 148541 ||  || — || August 17, 2001 || Socorro || LINEAR || — || align=right | 1.8 km || 
|-id=542 bgcolor=#fefefe
| 148542 ||  || — || August 19, 2001 || Socorro || LINEAR || — || align=right | 1.6 km || 
|-id=543 bgcolor=#E9E9E9
| 148543 ||  || — || August 19, 2001 || Socorro || LINEAR || — || align=right | 1.4 km || 
|-id=544 bgcolor=#E9E9E9
| 148544 ||  || — || August 20, 2001 || Socorro || LINEAR || ADE || align=right | 4.2 km || 
|-id=545 bgcolor=#fefefe
| 148545 ||  || — || August 22, 2001 || Socorro || LINEAR || — || align=right | 1.7 km || 
|-id=546 bgcolor=#fefefe
| 148546 ||  || — || August 24, 2001 || Socorro || LINEAR || NYS || align=right | 1.1 km || 
|-id=547 bgcolor=#fefefe
| 148547 ||  || — || August 21, 2001 || Kitt Peak || Spacewatch || NYS || align=right | 1.3 km || 
|-id=548 bgcolor=#E9E9E9
| 148548 ||  || — || August 23, 2001 || Kitt Peak || Spacewatch || KRM || align=right | 3.5 km || 
|-id=549 bgcolor=#E9E9E9
| 148549 ||  || — || August 20, 2001 || Palomar || NEAT || EUN || align=right | 2.8 km || 
|-id=550 bgcolor=#E9E9E9
| 148550 ||  || — || August 26, 2001 || Socorro || LINEAR || BRU || align=right | 6.5 km || 
|-id=551 bgcolor=#E9E9E9
| 148551 ||  || — || August 23, 2001 || Anderson Mesa || LONEOS || HNS || align=right | 2.1 km || 
|-id=552 bgcolor=#E9E9E9
| 148552 ||  || — || August 23, 2001 || Anderson Mesa || LONEOS || — || align=right | 2.7 km || 
|-id=553 bgcolor=#E9E9E9
| 148553 ||  || — || August 23, 2001 || Anderson Mesa || LONEOS || — || align=right | 1.7 km || 
|-id=554 bgcolor=#E9E9E9
| 148554 ||  || — || August 31, 2001 || Desert Eagle || W. K. Y. Yeung || — || align=right | 1.7 km || 
|-id=555 bgcolor=#fefefe
| 148555 ||  || — || August 21, 2001 || Haleakala || NEAT || LCI || align=right | 1.5 km || 
|-id=556 bgcolor=#fefefe
| 148556 ||  || — || August 26, 2001 || Kitt Peak || Spacewatch || NYS || align=right | 1.5 km || 
|-id=557 bgcolor=#E9E9E9
| 148557 ||  || — || August 22, 2001 || Socorro || LINEAR || — || align=right | 5.4 km || 
|-id=558 bgcolor=#E9E9E9
| 148558 ||  || — || August 22, 2001 || Socorro || LINEAR || — || align=right | 3.3 km || 
|-id=559 bgcolor=#fefefe
| 148559 ||  || — || August 23, 2001 || Anderson Mesa || LONEOS || — || align=right | 1.6 km || 
|-id=560 bgcolor=#fefefe
| 148560 ||  || — || August 23, 2001 || Anderson Mesa || LONEOS || — || align=right | 1.6 km || 
|-id=561 bgcolor=#d6d6d6
| 148561 ||  || — || August 23, 2001 || Anderson Mesa || LONEOS || KOR || align=right | 2.3 km || 
|-id=562 bgcolor=#E9E9E9
| 148562 ||  || — || August 23, 2001 || Anderson Mesa || LONEOS || — || align=right | 1.5 km || 
|-id=563 bgcolor=#E9E9E9
| 148563 ||  || — || August 23, 2001 || Socorro || LINEAR || — || align=right | 5.4 km || 
|-id=564 bgcolor=#E9E9E9
| 148564 ||  || — || August 24, 2001 || Anderson Mesa || LONEOS || GER || align=right | 1.9 km || 
|-id=565 bgcolor=#E9E9E9
| 148565 ||  || — || August 24, 2001 || Anderson Mesa || LONEOS || — || align=right | 3.0 km || 
|-id=566 bgcolor=#E9E9E9
| 148566 ||  || — || August 24, 2001 || Socorro || LINEAR || — || align=right | 1.8 km || 
|-id=567 bgcolor=#fefefe
| 148567 ||  || — || August 24, 2001 || Socorro || LINEAR || — || align=right | 1.8 km || 
|-id=568 bgcolor=#E9E9E9
| 148568 ||  || — || August 24, 2001 || Socorro || LINEAR || ADE || align=right | 4.8 km || 
|-id=569 bgcolor=#fefefe
| 148569 ||  || — || August 25, 2001 || Anderson Mesa || LONEOS || — || align=right | 2.3 km || 
|-id=570 bgcolor=#E9E9E9
| 148570 ||  || — || August 25, 2001 || Socorro || LINEAR || EUN || align=right | 1.9 km || 
|-id=571 bgcolor=#E9E9E9
| 148571 ||  || — || August 25, 2001 || Socorro || LINEAR || RAF || align=right | 1.5 km || 
|-id=572 bgcolor=#E9E9E9
| 148572 ||  || — || August 26, 2001 || Haleakala || NEAT || — || align=right | 3.3 km || 
|-id=573 bgcolor=#E9E9E9
| 148573 ||  || — || August 20, 2001 || Palomar || NEAT || — || align=right | 1.9 km || 
|-id=574 bgcolor=#E9E9E9
| 148574 ||  || — || August 20, 2001 || Haleakala || NEAT || GER || align=right | 2.8 km || 
|-id=575 bgcolor=#E9E9E9
| 148575 ||  || — || August 19, 2001 || Eskridge || Farpoint Obs. || — || align=right | 2.0 km || 
|-id=576 bgcolor=#E9E9E9
| 148576 ||  || — || August 19, 2001 || Socorro || LINEAR || — || align=right | 2.7 km || 
|-id=577 bgcolor=#E9E9E9
| 148577 ||  || — || August 18, 2001 || Palomar || NEAT || — || align=right | 2.4 km || 
|-id=578 bgcolor=#E9E9E9
| 148578 ||  || — || August 17, 2001 || Palomar || NEAT || — || align=right | 1.5 km || 
|-id=579 bgcolor=#E9E9E9
| 148579 ||  || — || August 17, 2001 || Socorro || LINEAR || — || align=right | 2.6 km || 
|-id=580 bgcolor=#E9E9E9
| 148580 ||  || — || August 16, 2001 || Socorro || LINEAR || — || align=right | 1.9 km || 
|-id=581 bgcolor=#E9E9E9
| 148581 ||  || — || August 16, 2001 || Socorro || LINEAR || — || align=right | 2.4 km || 
|-id=582 bgcolor=#E9E9E9
| 148582 ||  || — || August 20, 2001 || Haleakala || NEAT || EUN || align=right | 2.2 km || 
|-id=583 bgcolor=#E9E9E9
| 148583 ||  || — || August 20, 2001 || Haleakala || NEAT || JUN || align=right | 1.6 km || 
|-id=584 bgcolor=#d6d6d6
| 148584 ||  || — || August 27, 2001 || Palomar || NEAT || EOS || align=right | 3.5 km || 
|-id=585 bgcolor=#fefefe
| 148585 ||  || — || September 8, 2001 || Socorro || LINEAR || — || align=right | 1.4 km || 
|-id=586 bgcolor=#E9E9E9
| 148586 ||  || — || September 9, 2001 || Desert Eagle || W. K. Y. Yeung || — || align=right | 1.3 km || 
|-id=587 bgcolor=#E9E9E9
| 148587 ||  || — || September 10, 2001 || Desert Eagle || W. K. Y. Yeung || — || align=right | 2.8 km || 
|-id=588 bgcolor=#E9E9E9
| 148588 ||  || — || September 8, 2001 || Socorro || LINEAR || — || align=right | 1.4 km || 
|-id=589 bgcolor=#E9E9E9
| 148589 ||  || — || September 10, 2001 || Desert Eagle || W. K. Y. Yeung || — || align=right | 3.3 km || 
|-id=590 bgcolor=#fefefe
| 148590 ||  || — || September 7, 2001 || Socorro || LINEAR || — || align=right | 1.5 km || 
|-id=591 bgcolor=#fefefe
| 148591 ||  || — || September 10, 2001 || Kanab || E. E. Sheridan || — || align=right | 1.4 km || 
|-id=592 bgcolor=#d6d6d6
| 148592 ||  || — || September 11, 2001 || Desert Eagle || W. K. Y. Yeung || KOR || align=right | 2.8 km || 
|-id=593 bgcolor=#E9E9E9
| 148593 ||  || — || September 7, 2001 || Socorro || LINEAR || — || align=right | 2.2 km || 
|-id=594 bgcolor=#E9E9E9
| 148594 ||  || — || September 7, 2001 || Socorro || LINEAR || RAF || align=right | 1.2 km || 
|-id=595 bgcolor=#E9E9E9
| 148595 ||  || — || September 8, 2001 || Socorro || LINEAR || — || align=right | 2.7 km || 
|-id=596 bgcolor=#E9E9E9
| 148596 ||  || — || September 8, 2001 || Socorro || LINEAR || — || align=right | 3.1 km || 
|-id=597 bgcolor=#E9E9E9
| 148597 ||  || — || September 8, 2001 || Socorro || LINEAR || GER || align=right | 2.2 km || 
|-id=598 bgcolor=#E9E9E9
| 148598 ||  || — || September 11, 2001 || Socorro || LINEAR || — || align=right | 2.9 km || 
|-id=599 bgcolor=#E9E9E9
| 148599 ||  || — || September 10, 2001 || Socorro || LINEAR || — || align=right | 3.0 km || 
|-id=600 bgcolor=#fefefe
| 148600 ||  || — || September 12, 2001 || Socorro || LINEAR || NYS || align=right data-sort-value="0.96" | 960 m || 
|}

148601–148700 

|-bgcolor=#E9E9E9
| 148601 ||  || — || September 12, 2001 || Socorro || LINEAR || — || align=right | 1.2 km || 
|-id=602 bgcolor=#fefefe
| 148602 ||  || — || September 12, 2001 || Socorro || LINEAR || — || align=right | 4.6 km || 
|-id=603 bgcolor=#fefefe
| 148603 ||  || — || September 12, 2001 || Socorro || LINEAR || — || align=right | 1.1 km || 
|-id=604 bgcolor=#E9E9E9
| 148604 Shobbrook ||  ||  || September 11, 2001 || Oakley || C. Wolfe || — || align=right | 2.6 km || 
|-id=605 bgcolor=#E9E9E9
| 148605 ||  || — || September 11, 2001 || Anderson Mesa || LONEOS || — || align=right | 1.5 km || 
|-id=606 bgcolor=#fefefe
| 148606 ||  || — || September 10, 2001 || Socorro || LINEAR || V || align=right | 1.7 km || 
|-id=607 bgcolor=#E9E9E9
| 148607 ||  || — || September 13, 2001 || Palomar || NEAT || MAR || align=right | 2.4 km || 
|-id=608 bgcolor=#E9E9E9
| 148608 ||  || — || September 14, 2001 || Palomar || NEAT || ADE || align=right | 5.2 km || 
|-id=609 bgcolor=#E9E9E9
| 148609 ||  || — || September 11, 2001 || Anderson Mesa || LONEOS || — || align=right | 3.7 km || 
|-id=610 bgcolor=#E9E9E9
| 148610 ||  || — || September 12, 2001 || Kitt Peak || Spacewatch || — || align=right | 2.0 km || 
|-id=611 bgcolor=#fefefe
| 148611 ||  || — || September 12, 2001 || Socorro || LINEAR || NYS || align=right | 1.2 km || 
|-id=612 bgcolor=#fefefe
| 148612 ||  || — || September 12, 2001 || Socorro || LINEAR || NYS || align=right | 1.0 km || 
|-id=613 bgcolor=#fefefe
| 148613 ||  || — || September 12, 2001 || Socorro || LINEAR || — || align=right | 1.5 km || 
|-id=614 bgcolor=#fefefe
| 148614 ||  || — || September 12, 2001 || Socorro || LINEAR || NYS || align=right | 1.1 km || 
|-id=615 bgcolor=#E9E9E9
| 148615 ||  || — || September 12, 2001 || Socorro || LINEAR || — || align=right | 1.6 km || 
|-id=616 bgcolor=#fefefe
| 148616 ||  || — || September 12, 2001 || Socorro || LINEAR || — || align=right | 2.0 km || 
|-id=617 bgcolor=#E9E9E9
| 148617 ||  || — || September 12, 2001 || Socorro || LINEAR || — || align=right | 2.3 km || 
|-id=618 bgcolor=#E9E9E9
| 148618 ||  || — || September 12, 2001 || Socorro || LINEAR || — || align=right | 1.7 km || 
|-id=619 bgcolor=#E9E9E9
| 148619 ||  || — || September 12, 2001 || Socorro || LINEAR || — || align=right | 3.6 km || 
|-id=620 bgcolor=#E9E9E9
| 148620 ||  || — || September 12, 2001 || Socorro || LINEAR || — || align=right | 1.5 km || 
|-id=621 bgcolor=#E9E9E9
| 148621 ||  || — || September 12, 2001 || Socorro || LINEAR || — || align=right | 1.4 km || 
|-id=622 bgcolor=#E9E9E9
| 148622 ||  || — || September 12, 2001 || Socorro || LINEAR || — || align=right | 1.5 km || 
|-id=623 bgcolor=#E9E9E9
| 148623 ||  || — || September 12, 2001 || Socorro || LINEAR || — || align=right | 1.5 km || 
|-id=624 bgcolor=#fefefe
| 148624 ||  || — || September 12, 2001 || Socorro || LINEAR || MAS || align=right | 1.9 km || 
|-id=625 bgcolor=#E9E9E9
| 148625 ||  || — || September 12, 2001 || Socorro || LINEAR || — || align=right | 1.5 km || 
|-id=626 bgcolor=#E9E9E9
| 148626 ||  || — || September 12, 2001 || Socorro || LINEAR || EUN || align=right | 1.9 km || 
|-id=627 bgcolor=#E9E9E9
| 148627 ||  || — || September 12, 2001 || Socorro || LINEAR || — || align=right | 2.0 km || 
|-id=628 bgcolor=#E9E9E9
| 148628 ||  || — || September 11, 2001 || Anderson Mesa || LONEOS || — || align=right | 2.2 km || 
|-id=629 bgcolor=#E9E9E9
| 148629 ||  || — || September 11, 2001 || Anderson Mesa || LONEOS || — || align=right | 2.8 km || 
|-id=630 bgcolor=#E9E9E9
| 148630 ||  || — || September 12, 2001 || Socorro || LINEAR || JUN || align=right | 1.3 km || 
|-id=631 bgcolor=#E9E9E9
| 148631 ||  || — || September 17, 2001 || Desert Eagle || W. K. Y. Yeung || — || align=right | 2.8 km || 
|-id=632 bgcolor=#E9E9E9
| 148632 ||  || — || September 16, 2001 || Socorro || LINEAR || MAR || align=right | 1.7 km || 
|-id=633 bgcolor=#E9E9E9
| 148633 ||  || — || September 16, 2001 || Socorro || LINEAR || ADE || align=right | 3.3 km || 
|-id=634 bgcolor=#E9E9E9
| 148634 ||  || — || September 16, 2001 || Socorro || LINEAR || — || align=right | 1.3 km || 
|-id=635 bgcolor=#E9E9E9
| 148635 ||  || — || September 16, 2001 || Socorro || LINEAR || — || align=right | 3.1 km || 
|-id=636 bgcolor=#E9E9E9
| 148636 ||  || — || September 16, 2001 || Socorro || LINEAR || — || align=right | 1.1 km || 
|-id=637 bgcolor=#E9E9E9
| 148637 ||  || — || September 16, 2001 || Socorro || LINEAR || — || align=right | 1.7 km || 
|-id=638 bgcolor=#fefefe
| 148638 ||  || — || September 16, 2001 || Socorro || LINEAR || NYS || align=right | 1.1 km || 
|-id=639 bgcolor=#d6d6d6
| 148639 ||  || — || September 16, 2001 || Socorro || LINEAR || KOR || align=right | 2.8 km || 
|-id=640 bgcolor=#E9E9E9
| 148640 ||  || — || September 16, 2001 || Socorro || LINEAR || — || align=right | 3.8 km || 
|-id=641 bgcolor=#E9E9E9
| 148641 ||  || — || September 16, 2001 || Socorro || LINEAR || — || align=right | 2.0 km || 
|-id=642 bgcolor=#E9E9E9
| 148642 ||  || — || September 16, 2001 || Socorro || LINEAR || EUN || align=right | 1.8 km || 
|-id=643 bgcolor=#fefefe
| 148643 ||  || — || September 16, 2001 || Socorro || LINEAR || — || align=right | 1.4 km || 
|-id=644 bgcolor=#E9E9E9
| 148644 ||  || — || September 16, 2001 || Socorro || LINEAR || — || align=right | 4.1 km || 
|-id=645 bgcolor=#E9E9E9
| 148645 ||  || — || September 17, 2001 || Socorro || LINEAR || — || align=right | 3.6 km || 
|-id=646 bgcolor=#E9E9E9
| 148646 ||  || — || September 17, 2001 || Socorro || LINEAR || — || align=right | 1.9 km || 
|-id=647 bgcolor=#fefefe
| 148647 ||  || — || September 19, 2001 || Anderson Mesa || LONEOS || V || align=right | 1.5 km || 
|-id=648 bgcolor=#fefefe
| 148648 ||  || — || September 20, 2001 || Socorro || LINEAR || NYS || align=right data-sort-value="0.95" | 950 m || 
|-id=649 bgcolor=#E9E9E9
| 148649 ||  || — || September 20, 2001 || Socorro || LINEAR || — || align=right | 1.5 km || 
|-id=650 bgcolor=#fefefe
| 148650 ||  || — || September 20, 2001 || Socorro || LINEAR || NYS || align=right | 1.5 km || 
|-id=651 bgcolor=#E9E9E9
| 148651 ||  || — || September 20, 2001 || Socorro || LINEAR || ADE || align=right | 4.7 km || 
|-id=652 bgcolor=#E9E9E9
| 148652 ||  || — || September 20, 2001 || Socorro || LINEAR || MAR || align=right | 2.7 km || 
|-id=653 bgcolor=#E9E9E9
| 148653 ||  || — || September 16, 2001 || Socorro || LINEAR || — || align=right | 1.4 km || 
|-id=654 bgcolor=#E9E9E9
| 148654 ||  || — || September 16, 2001 || Socorro || LINEAR || EUN || align=right | 2.2 km || 
|-id=655 bgcolor=#fefefe
| 148655 ||  || — || September 16, 2001 || Socorro || LINEAR || — || align=right | 4.2 km || 
|-id=656 bgcolor=#fefefe
| 148656 ||  || — || September 16, 2001 || Socorro || LINEAR || — || align=right | 1.5 km || 
|-id=657 bgcolor=#fefefe
| 148657 ||  || — || September 16, 2001 || Socorro || LINEAR || — || align=right | 1.5 km || 
|-id=658 bgcolor=#fefefe
| 148658 ||  || — || September 16, 2001 || Socorro || LINEAR || SUL || align=right | 3.0 km || 
|-id=659 bgcolor=#E9E9E9
| 148659 ||  || — || September 16, 2001 || Socorro || LINEAR || — || align=right | 2.2 km || 
|-id=660 bgcolor=#E9E9E9
| 148660 ||  || — || September 16, 2001 || Socorro || LINEAR || — || align=right | 4.4 km || 
|-id=661 bgcolor=#fefefe
| 148661 ||  || — || September 16, 2001 || Socorro || LINEAR || NYS || align=right | 1.4 km || 
|-id=662 bgcolor=#E9E9E9
| 148662 ||  || — || September 16, 2001 || Socorro || LINEAR || — || align=right | 1.3 km || 
|-id=663 bgcolor=#E9E9E9
| 148663 ||  || — || September 16, 2001 || Socorro || LINEAR || — || align=right | 1.9 km || 
|-id=664 bgcolor=#E9E9E9
| 148664 ||  || — || September 17, 2001 || Socorro || LINEAR || — || align=right | 2.9 km || 
|-id=665 bgcolor=#E9E9E9
| 148665 ||  || — || September 17, 2001 || Socorro || LINEAR || RAF || align=right | 1.5 km || 
|-id=666 bgcolor=#E9E9E9
| 148666 ||  || — || September 17, 2001 || Socorro || LINEAR || — || align=right | 3.6 km || 
|-id=667 bgcolor=#E9E9E9
| 148667 ||  || — || September 17, 2001 || Socorro || LINEAR || — || align=right | 2.4 km || 
|-id=668 bgcolor=#E9E9E9
| 148668 ||  || — || September 17, 2001 || Socorro || LINEAR || — || align=right | 2.1 km || 
|-id=669 bgcolor=#E9E9E9
| 148669 ||  || — || September 17, 2001 || Socorro || LINEAR || — || align=right | 3.0 km || 
|-id=670 bgcolor=#fefefe
| 148670 ||  || — || September 19, 2001 || Socorro || LINEAR || NYS || align=right | 1.1 km || 
|-id=671 bgcolor=#E9E9E9
| 148671 ||  || — || September 19, 2001 || Socorro || LINEAR || — || align=right | 1.6 km || 
|-id=672 bgcolor=#E9E9E9
| 148672 ||  || — || September 16, 2001 || Socorro || LINEAR || — || align=right | 2.2 km || 
|-id=673 bgcolor=#E9E9E9
| 148673 ||  || — || September 16, 2001 || Socorro || LINEAR || MIS || align=right | 4.1 km || 
|-id=674 bgcolor=#E9E9E9
| 148674 ||  || — || September 19, 2001 || Socorro || LINEAR || — || align=right | 1.7 km || 
|-id=675 bgcolor=#fefefe
| 148675 ||  || — || September 19, 2001 || Socorro || LINEAR || — || align=right | 1.2 km || 
|-id=676 bgcolor=#E9E9E9
| 148676 ||  || — || September 19, 2001 || Socorro || LINEAR || — || align=right | 1.8 km || 
|-id=677 bgcolor=#fefefe
| 148677 ||  || — || September 19, 2001 || Socorro || LINEAR || — || align=right | 1.3 km || 
|-id=678 bgcolor=#E9E9E9
| 148678 ||  || — || September 19, 2001 || Socorro || LINEAR || — || align=right | 1.4 km || 
|-id=679 bgcolor=#E9E9E9
| 148679 ||  || — || September 19, 2001 || Socorro || LINEAR || JUN || align=right | 2.5 km || 
|-id=680 bgcolor=#E9E9E9
| 148680 ||  || — || September 19, 2001 || Socorro || LINEAR || — || align=right | 1.4 km || 
|-id=681 bgcolor=#d6d6d6
| 148681 ||  || — || September 19, 2001 || Socorro || LINEAR || — || align=right | 4.5 km || 
|-id=682 bgcolor=#E9E9E9
| 148682 ||  || — || September 19, 2001 || Socorro || LINEAR || — || align=right | 1.2 km || 
|-id=683 bgcolor=#d6d6d6
| 148683 ||  || — || September 19, 2001 || Socorro || LINEAR || KOR || align=right | 3.1 km || 
|-id=684 bgcolor=#E9E9E9
| 148684 ||  || — || September 19, 2001 || Socorro || LINEAR || — || align=right | 1.6 km || 
|-id=685 bgcolor=#E9E9E9
| 148685 ||  || — || September 19, 2001 || Socorro || LINEAR || — || align=right | 1.5 km || 
|-id=686 bgcolor=#E9E9E9
| 148686 ||  || — || September 19, 2001 || Socorro || LINEAR || — || align=right | 2.3 km || 
|-id=687 bgcolor=#E9E9E9
| 148687 ||  || — || September 19, 2001 || Socorro || LINEAR || — || align=right | 1.5 km || 
|-id=688 bgcolor=#E9E9E9
| 148688 ||  || — || September 19, 2001 || Socorro || LINEAR || — || align=right | 2.0 km || 
|-id=689 bgcolor=#E9E9E9
| 148689 ||  || — || September 19, 2001 || Socorro || LINEAR || — || align=right | 2.6 km || 
|-id=690 bgcolor=#E9E9E9
| 148690 ||  || — || September 19, 2001 || Socorro || LINEAR || — || align=right | 1.6 km || 
|-id=691 bgcolor=#E9E9E9
| 148691 ||  || — || September 19, 2001 || Socorro || LINEAR || — || align=right | 2.0 km || 
|-id=692 bgcolor=#E9E9E9
| 148692 ||  || — || September 19, 2001 || Socorro || LINEAR || — || align=right | 1.5 km || 
|-id=693 bgcolor=#E9E9E9
| 148693 ||  || — || September 19, 2001 || Socorro || LINEAR || — || align=right | 2.3 km || 
|-id=694 bgcolor=#E9E9E9
| 148694 ||  || — || September 19, 2001 || Socorro || LINEAR || — || align=right | 2.4 km || 
|-id=695 bgcolor=#E9E9E9
| 148695 ||  || — || September 19, 2001 || Socorro || LINEAR || — || align=right | 1.4 km || 
|-id=696 bgcolor=#E9E9E9
| 148696 ||  || — || September 20, 2001 || Socorro || LINEAR || — || align=right | 1.4 km || 
|-id=697 bgcolor=#E9E9E9
| 148697 ||  || — || September 20, 2001 || Socorro || LINEAR || — || align=right | 2.2 km || 
|-id=698 bgcolor=#E9E9E9
| 148698 ||  || — || September 24, 2001 || Socorro || LINEAR || — || align=right | 2.7 km || 
|-id=699 bgcolor=#E9E9E9
| 148699 ||  || — || September 20, 2001 || Socorro || LINEAR || — || align=right | 2.5 km || 
|-id=700 bgcolor=#E9E9E9
| 148700 ||  || — || September 21, 2001 || Anderson Mesa || LONEOS || — || align=right | 1.8 km || 
|}

148701–148800 

|-bgcolor=#E9E9E9
| 148701 ||  || — || September 29, 2001 || Palomar || NEAT || — || align=right | 2.7 km || 
|-id=702 bgcolor=#E9E9E9
| 148702 ||  || — || September 25, 2001 || Socorro || LINEAR || MAR || align=right | 2.1 km || 
|-id=703 bgcolor=#fefefe
| 148703 ||  || — || September 23, 2001 || Socorro || LINEAR || — || align=right | 1.3 km || 
|-id=704 bgcolor=#E9E9E9
| 148704 ||  || — || September 25, 2001 || Socorro || LINEAR || ADE || align=right | 3.6 km || 
|-id=705 bgcolor=#E9E9E9
| 148705 ||  || — || September 21, 2001 || Anderson Mesa || LONEOS || — || align=right | 2.4 km || 
|-id=706 bgcolor=#E9E9E9
| 148706 ||  || — || September 29, 2001 || Palomar || NEAT || HNS || align=right | 1.5 km || 
|-id=707 bgcolor=#E9E9E9
| 148707 Dodelson ||  ||  || September 19, 2001 || Apache Point || SDSS || EUN || align=right | 1.9 km || 
|-id=708 bgcolor=#E9E9E9
| 148708 ||  || — || October 10, 2001 || Palomar || NEAT || — || align=right | 1.6 km || 
|-id=709 bgcolor=#fefefe
| 148709 ||  || — || October 13, 2001 || Socorro || LINEAR || H || align=right | 1.2 km || 
|-id=710 bgcolor=#E9E9E9
| 148710 ||  || — || October 9, 2001 || Socorro || LINEAR || — || align=right | 2.8 km || 
|-id=711 bgcolor=#E9E9E9
| 148711 ||  || — || October 13, 2001 || Socorro || LINEAR || — || align=right | 1.6 km || 
|-id=712 bgcolor=#E9E9E9
| 148712 ||  || — || October 14, 2001 || Socorro || LINEAR || — || align=right | 2.0 km || 
|-id=713 bgcolor=#E9E9E9
| 148713 ||  || — || October 14, 2001 || Socorro || LINEAR || GEF || align=right | 2.5 km || 
|-id=714 bgcolor=#E9E9E9
| 148714 ||  || — || October 14, 2001 || Socorro || LINEAR || — || align=right | 2.9 km || 
|-id=715 bgcolor=#E9E9E9
| 148715 ||  || — || October 14, 2001 || Socorro || LINEAR || — || align=right | 4.6 km || 
|-id=716 bgcolor=#E9E9E9
| 148716 ||  || — || October 14, 2001 || Socorro || LINEAR || — || align=right | 4.1 km || 
|-id=717 bgcolor=#E9E9E9
| 148717 ||  || — || October 13, 2001 || Socorro || LINEAR || — || align=right | 3.5 km || 
|-id=718 bgcolor=#E9E9E9
| 148718 ||  || — || October 13, 2001 || Socorro || LINEAR || — || align=right | 1.5 km || 
|-id=719 bgcolor=#E9E9E9
| 148719 ||  || — || October 13, 2001 || Socorro || LINEAR || — || align=right | 3.0 km || 
|-id=720 bgcolor=#E9E9E9
| 148720 ||  || — || October 13, 2001 || Socorro || LINEAR || — || align=right | 3.2 km || 
|-id=721 bgcolor=#E9E9E9
| 148721 ||  || — || October 13, 2001 || Socorro || LINEAR || — || align=right | 2.9 km || 
|-id=722 bgcolor=#E9E9E9
| 148722 ||  || — || October 13, 2001 || Socorro || LINEAR || MAR || align=right | 2.3 km || 
|-id=723 bgcolor=#E9E9E9
| 148723 ||  || — || October 13, 2001 || Socorro || LINEAR || — || align=right | 2.4 km || 
|-id=724 bgcolor=#E9E9E9
| 148724 ||  || — || October 13, 2001 || Socorro || LINEAR || — || align=right | 2.3 km || 
|-id=725 bgcolor=#E9E9E9
| 148725 ||  || — || October 13, 2001 || Socorro || LINEAR || — || align=right | 2.2 km || 
|-id=726 bgcolor=#E9E9E9
| 148726 ||  || — || October 13, 2001 || Socorro || LINEAR || MIS || align=right | 5.8 km || 
|-id=727 bgcolor=#E9E9E9
| 148727 ||  || — || October 13, 2001 || Socorro || LINEAR || — || align=right | 3.0 km || 
|-id=728 bgcolor=#E9E9E9
| 148728 ||  || — || October 14, 2001 || Socorro || LINEAR || MIS || align=right | 3.1 km || 
|-id=729 bgcolor=#E9E9E9
| 148729 ||  || — || October 14, 2001 || Socorro || LINEAR || — || align=right | 2.0 km || 
|-id=730 bgcolor=#fefefe
| 148730 ||  || — || October 14, 2001 || Socorro || LINEAR || V || align=right | 1.3 km || 
|-id=731 bgcolor=#E9E9E9
| 148731 ||  || — || October 14, 2001 || Socorro || LINEAR || — || align=right | 2.7 km || 
|-id=732 bgcolor=#E9E9E9
| 148732 ||  || — || October 14, 2001 || Socorro || LINEAR || — || align=right | 1.6 km || 
|-id=733 bgcolor=#E9E9E9
| 148733 ||  || — || October 14, 2001 || Socorro || LINEAR || — || align=right | 2.3 km || 
|-id=734 bgcolor=#E9E9E9
| 148734 ||  || — || October 15, 2001 || Socorro || LINEAR || — || align=right | 4.7 km || 
|-id=735 bgcolor=#E9E9E9
| 148735 ||  || — || October 15, 2001 || Desert Eagle || W. K. Y. Yeung || GEF || align=right | 5.1 km || 
|-id=736 bgcolor=#E9E9E9
| 148736 ||  || — || October 13, 2001 || Socorro || LINEAR || — || align=right | 4.2 km || 
|-id=737 bgcolor=#E9E9E9
| 148737 ||  || — || October 14, 2001 || Socorro || LINEAR || — || align=right | 4.7 km || 
|-id=738 bgcolor=#E9E9E9
| 148738 ||  || — || October 14, 2001 || Socorro || LINEAR || HNS || align=right | 2.0 km || 
|-id=739 bgcolor=#E9E9E9
| 148739 ||  || — || October 14, 2001 || Socorro || LINEAR || GEF || align=right | 2.1 km || 
|-id=740 bgcolor=#E9E9E9
| 148740 ||  || — || October 14, 2001 || Socorro || LINEAR || GEF || align=right | 2.7 km || 
|-id=741 bgcolor=#E9E9E9
| 148741 ||  || — || October 15, 2001 || Socorro || LINEAR || EUN || align=right | 2.3 km || 
|-id=742 bgcolor=#E9E9E9
| 148742 ||  || — || October 15, 2001 || Socorro || LINEAR || — || align=right | 2.3 km || 
|-id=743 bgcolor=#E9E9E9
| 148743 ||  || — || October 12, 2001 || Haleakala || NEAT || — || align=right | 2.8 km || 
|-id=744 bgcolor=#E9E9E9
| 148744 ||  || — || October 12, 2001 || Haleakala || NEAT || — || align=right | 5.7 km || 
|-id=745 bgcolor=#E9E9E9
| 148745 ||  || — || October 13, 2001 || Palomar || NEAT || — || align=right | 2.6 km || 
|-id=746 bgcolor=#fefefe
| 148746 ||  || — || October 10, 2001 || Palomar || NEAT || — || align=right | 1.5 km || 
|-id=747 bgcolor=#fefefe
| 148747 ||  || — || October 10, 2001 || Palomar || NEAT || — || align=right | 1.4 km || 
|-id=748 bgcolor=#E9E9E9
| 148748 ||  || — || October 11, 2001 || Palomar || NEAT || — || align=right | 2.0 km || 
|-id=749 bgcolor=#E9E9E9
| 148749 ||  || — || October 13, 2001 || Palomar || NEAT || MAR || align=right | 2.1 km || 
|-id=750 bgcolor=#E9E9E9
| 148750 ||  || — || October 15, 2001 || Palomar || NEAT || — || align=right | 2.4 km || 
|-id=751 bgcolor=#E9E9E9
| 148751 ||  || — || October 14, 2001 || Socorro || LINEAR || — || align=right | 1.9 km || 
|-id=752 bgcolor=#E9E9E9
| 148752 ||  || — || October 14, 2001 || Socorro || LINEAR || — || align=right | 2.0 km || 
|-id=753 bgcolor=#E9E9E9
| 148753 ||  || — || October 14, 2001 || Socorro || LINEAR || — || align=right | 2.4 km || 
|-id=754 bgcolor=#fefefe
| 148754 ||  || — || October 14, 2001 || Socorro || LINEAR || — || align=right | 2.2 km || 
|-id=755 bgcolor=#E9E9E9
| 148755 ||  || — || October 14, 2001 || Socorro || LINEAR || GEF || align=right | 1.9 km || 
|-id=756 bgcolor=#fefefe
| 148756 ||  || — || October 15, 2001 || Socorro || LINEAR || NYS || align=right | 1.1 km || 
|-id=757 bgcolor=#E9E9E9
| 148757 ||  || — || October 15, 2001 || Palomar || NEAT || — || align=right | 3.3 km || 
|-id=758 bgcolor=#fefefe
| 148758 ||  || — || October 14, 2001 || Palomar || NEAT || — || align=right | 1.9 km || 
|-id=759 bgcolor=#E9E9E9
| 148759 ||  || — || October 11, 2001 || Socorro || LINEAR || — || align=right | 4.0 km || 
|-id=760 bgcolor=#E9E9E9
| 148760 ||  || — || October 13, 2001 || Palomar || NEAT || — || align=right | 1.8 km || 
|-id=761 bgcolor=#E9E9E9
| 148761 ||  || — || October 13, 2001 || Palomar || NEAT || — || align=right | 2.8 km || 
|-id=762 bgcolor=#E9E9E9
| 148762 ||  || — || October 14, 2001 || Anderson Mesa || LONEOS || — || align=right | 1.6 km || 
|-id=763 bgcolor=#E9E9E9
| 148763 ||  || — || October 14, 2001 || Anderson Mesa || LONEOS || — || align=right | 2.1 km || 
|-id=764 bgcolor=#E9E9E9
| 148764 ||  || — || October 15, 2001 || Needville || Needville Obs. || — || align=right | 1.5 km || 
|-id=765 bgcolor=#E9E9E9
| 148765 ||  || — || October 15, 2001 || Socorro || LINEAR || MAR || align=right | 2.1 km || 
|-id=766 bgcolor=#E9E9E9
| 148766 ||  || — || October 15, 2001 || Socorro || LINEAR || — || align=right | 2.0 km || 
|-id=767 bgcolor=#E9E9E9
| 148767 ||  || — || October 15, 2001 || Palomar || NEAT || — || align=right | 2.2 km || 
|-id=768 bgcolor=#E9E9E9
| 148768 ||  || — || October 15, 2001 || Palomar || NEAT || — || align=right | 2.6 km || 
|-id=769 bgcolor=#E9E9E9
| 148769 ||  || — || October 15, 2001 || Palomar || NEAT || — || align=right | 5.0 km || 
|-id=770 bgcolor=#E9E9E9
| 148770 ||  || — || October 10, 2001 || Palomar || NEAT || — || align=right | 2.7 km || 
|-id=771 bgcolor=#E9E9E9
| 148771 || 2001 UN || — || October 16, 2001 || Elmira || A. J. Cecce || EUN || align=right | 2.0 km || 
|-id=772 bgcolor=#E9E9E9
| 148772 ||  || — || October 20, 2001 || Emerald Lane || L. Ball || — || align=right | 2.1 km || 
|-id=773 bgcolor=#E9E9E9
| 148773 ||  || — || October 16, 2001 || Socorro || LINEAR || — || align=right | 4.1 km || 
|-id=774 bgcolor=#E9E9E9
| 148774 ||  || — || October 17, 2001 || Desert Eagle || W. K. Y. Yeung || — || align=right | 2.6 km || 
|-id=775 bgcolor=#E9E9E9
| 148775 ||  || — || October 17, 2001 || Desert Eagle || W. K. Y. Yeung || — || align=right | 1.9 km || 
|-id=776 bgcolor=#E9E9E9
| 148776 ||  || — || October 17, 2001 || Socorro || LINEAR || — || align=right | 2.2 km || 
|-id=777 bgcolor=#E9E9E9
| 148777 ||  || — || October 16, 2001 || Desert Eagle || W. K. Y. Yeung || — || align=right | 2.8 km || 
|-id=778 bgcolor=#E9E9E9
| 148778 ||  || — || October 24, 2001 || Desert Eagle || W. K. Y. Yeung || — || align=right | 1.9 km || 
|-id=779 bgcolor=#E9E9E9
| 148779 ||  || — || October 16, 2001 || Kitt Peak || Spacewatch || — || align=right | 2.4 km || 
|-id=780 bgcolor=#C2E0FF
| 148780 Altjira ||  ||  || October 20, 2001 || Kitt Peak || DES || cubewano (hot)mooncritical || align=right | 307 km || 
|-id=781 bgcolor=#E9E9E9
| 148781 ||  || — || October 16, 2001 || Palomar || NEAT || — || align=right | 3.0 km || 
|-id=782 bgcolor=#E9E9E9
| 148782 ||  || — || October 17, 2001 || Socorro || LINEAR || — || align=right | 2.5 km || 
|-id=783 bgcolor=#E9E9E9
| 148783 ||  || — || October 17, 2001 || Socorro || LINEAR || — || align=right | 3.7 km || 
|-id=784 bgcolor=#E9E9E9
| 148784 ||  || — || October 18, 2001 || Socorro || LINEAR || EUN || align=right | 2.5 km || 
|-id=785 bgcolor=#E9E9E9
| 148785 ||  || — || October 18, 2001 || Socorro || LINEAR || ADE || align=right | 3.1 km || 
|-id=786 bgcolor=#E9E9E9
| 148786 ||  || — || October 16, 2001 || Socorro || LINEAR || — || align=right | 2.8 km || 
|-id=787 bgcolor=#E9E9E9
| 148787 ||  || — || October 16, 2001 || Socorro || LINEAR || — || align=right | 2.1 km || 
|-id=788 bgcolor=#E9E9E9
| 148788 ||  || — || October 17, 2001 || Socorro || LINEAR || RAF || align=right | 1.4 km || 
|-id=789 bgcolor=#E9E9E9
| 148789 ||  || — || October 17, 2001 || Socorro || LINEAR || EUN || align=right | 2.3 km || 
|-id=790 bgcolor=#E9E9E9
| 148790 ||  || — || October 17, 2001 || Socorro || LINEAR || — || align=right | 4.9 km || 
|-id=791 bgcolor=#E9E9E9
| 148791 ||  || — || October 17, 2001 || Socorro || LINEAR || — || align=right | 2.7 km || 
|-id=792 bgcolor=#E9E9E9
| 148792 ||  || — || October 18, 2001 || Socorro || LINEAR || — || align=right | 2.2 km || 
|-id=793 bgcolor=#d6d6d6
| 148793 ||  || — || October 17, 2001 || Socorro || LINEAR || — || align=right | 3.4 km || 
|-id=794 bgcolor=#E9E9E9
| 148794 ||  || — || October 17, 2001 || Socorro || LINEAR || — || align=right | 2.4 km || 
|-id=795 bgcolor=#E9E9E9
| 148795 ||  || — || October 18, 2001 || Socorro || LINEAR || — || align=right | 4.0 km || 
|-id=796 bgcolor=#E9E9E9
| 148796 ||  || — || October 19, 2001 || Socorro || LINEAR || — || align=right | 2.2 km || 
|-id=797 bgcolor=#E9E9E9
| 148797 ||  || — || October 20, 2001 || Socorro || LINEAR || — || align=right | 1.7 km || 
|-id=798 bgcolor=#E9E9E9
| 148798 ||  || — || October 17, 2001 || Socorro || LINEAR || MRX || align=right | 1.9 km || 
|-id=799 bgcolor=#E9E9E9
| 148799 ||  || — || October 20, 2001 || Socorro || LINEAR || — || align=right | 2.5 km || 
|-id=800 bgcolor=#E9E9E9
| 148800 ||  || — || October 18, 2001 || Palomar || NEAT || — || align=right | 1.7 km || 
|}

148801–148900 

|-bgcolor=#E9E9E9
| 148801 ||  || — || October 19, 2001 || Haleakala || NEAT || ADE || align=right | 3.6 km || 
|-id=802 bgcolor=#E9E9E9
| 148802 ||  || — || October 17, 2001 || Socorro || LINEAR || — || align=right | 2.1 km || 
|-id=803 bgcolor=#E9E9E9
| 148803 ||  || — || October 17, 2001 || Socorro || LINEAR || — || align=right | 2.6 km || 
|-id=804 bgcolor=#E9E9E9
| 148804 ||  || — || October 20, 2001 || Socorro || LINEAR || — || align=right | 2.2 km || 
|-id=805 bgcolor=#E9E9E9
| 148805 ||  || — || October 20, 2001 || Socorro || LINEAR || — || align=right | 3.1 km || 
|-id=806 bgcolor=#d6d6d6
| 148806 ||  || — || October 20, 2001 || Socorro || LINEAR || EUP || align=right | 7.0 km || 
|-id=807 bgcolor=#E9E9E9
| 148807 ||  || — || October 20, 2001 || Socorro || LINEAR || HEN || align=right | 1.8 km || 
|-id=808 bgcolor=#E9E9E9
| 148808 ||  || — || October 20, 2001 || Socorro || LINEAR || — || align=right | 3.1 km || 
|-id=809 bgcolor=#E9E9E9
| 148809 ||  || — || October 21, 2001 || Socorro || LINEAR || — || align=right | 1.7 km || 
|-id=810 bgcolor=#E9E9E9
| 148810 ||  || — || October 21, 2001 || Socorro || LINEAR || — || align=right | 2.8 km || 
|-id=811 bgcolor=#E9E9E9
| 148811 ||  || — || October 22, 2001 || Socorro || LINEAR || — || align=right | 2.2 km || 
|-id=812 bgcolor=#E9E9E9
| 148812 ||  || — || October 22, 2001 || Socorro || LINEAR || VIB || align=right | 4.3 km || 
|-id=813 bgcolor=#E9E9E9
| 148813 ||  || — || October 22, 2001 || Socorro || LINEAR || — || align=right | 2.4 km || 
|-id=814 bgcolor=#E9E9E9
| 148814 ||  || — || October 22, 2001 || Socorro || LINEAR || — || align=right | 2.4 km || 
|-id=815 bgcolor=#E9E9E9
| 148815 ||  || — || October 22, 2001 || Socorro || LINEAR || — || align=right | 2.1 km || 
|-id=816 bgcolor=#E9E9E9
| 148816 ||  || — || October 22, 2001 || Palomar || NEAT || — || align=right | 3.1 km || 
|-id=817 bgcolor=#E9E9E9
| 148817 ||  || — || October 22, 2001 || Palomar || NEAT || — || align=right | 3.1 km || 
|-id=818 bgcolor=#E9E9E9
| 148818 ||  || — || October 22, 2001 || Palomar || NEAT || ADE || align=right | 2.6 km || 
|-id=819 bgcolor=#E9E9E9
| 148819 ||  || — || October 17, 2001 || Socorro || LINEAR || — || align=right | 2.6 km || 
|-id=820 bgcolor=#E9E9E9
| 148820 ||  || — || October 17, 2001 || Socorro || LINEAR || — || align=right | 3.9 km || 
|-id=821 bgcolor=#E9E9E9
| 148821 ||  || — || October 20, 2001 || Socorro || LINEAR || — || align=right | 2.2 km || 
|-id=822 bgcolor=#E9E9E9
| 148822 ||  || — || October 21, 2001 || Socorro || LINEAR || MIS || align=right | 3.5 km || 
|-id=823 bgcolor=#E9E9E9
| 148823 ||  || — || October 23, 2001 || Socorro || LINEAR || — || align=right | 2.0 km || 
|-id=824 bgcolor=#E9E9E9
| 148824 ||  || — || October 23, 2001 || Socorro || LINEAR || HEN || align=right | 1.3 km || 
|-id=825 bgcolor=#d6d6d6
| 148825 ||  || — || October 23, 2001 || Socorro || LINEAR || — || align=right | 4.8 km || 
|-id=826 bgcolor=#E9E9E9
| 148826 ||  || — || October 23, 2001 || Socorro || LINEAR || — || align=right | 2.8 km || 
|-id=827 bgcolor=#d6d6d6
| 148827 ||  || — || October 23, 2001 || Socorro || LINEAR || — || align=right | 5.9 km || 
|-id=828 bgcolor=#E9E9E9
| 148828 ||  || — || October 23, 2001 || Socorro || LINEAR || — || align=right | 3.1 km || 
|-id=829 bgcolor=#E9E9E9
| 148829 ||  || — || October 19, 2001 || Socorro || LINEAR || — || align=right | 2.5 km || 
|-id=830 bgcolor=#E9E9E9
| 148830 ||  || — || October 19, 2001 || Socorro || LINEAR || — || align=right | 4.0 km || 
|-id=831 bgcolor=#E9E9E9
| 148831 ||  || — || October 19, 2001 || Socorro || LINEAR || — || align=right | 3.6 km || 
|-id=832 bgcolor=#E9E9E9
| 148832 ||  || — || October 21, 2001 || Kitt Peak || Spacewatch || — || align=right | 1.9 km || 
|-id=833 bgcolor=#E9E9E9
| 148833 ||  || — || October 23, 2001 || Socorro || LINEAR || — || align=right | 1.3 km || 
|-id=834 bgcolor=#E9E9E9
| 148834 ||  || — || October 18, 2001 || Socorro || LINEAR || — || align=right | 1.6 km || 
|-id=835 bgcolor=#E9E9E9
| 148835 ||  || — || October 18, 2001 || Socorro || LINEAR || KRM || align=right | 4.0 km || 
|-id=836 bgcolor=#d6d6d6
| 148836 ||  || — || October 18, 2001 || Palomar || NEAT || THM || align=right | 3.8 km || 
|-id=837 bgcolor=#E9E9E9
| 148837 ||  || — || October 21, 2001 || Anderson Mesa || LONEOS || HNS || align=right | 1.8 km || 
|-id=838 bgcolor=#E9E9E9
| 148838 ||  || — || October 23, 2001 || Socorro || LINEAR || AGN || align=right | 1.8 km || 
|-id=839 bgcolor=#E9E9E9
| 148839 ||  || — || October 26, 2001 || Kitt Peak || Spacewatch || EUN || align=right | 2.1 km || 
|-id=840 bgcolor=#E9E9E9
| 148840 ||  || — || November 9, 2001 || Socorro || LINEAR || — || align=right | 1.7 km || 
|-id=841 bgcolor=#E9E9E9
| 148841 ||  || — || November 10, 2001 || Socorro || LINEAR || — || align=right | 3.3 km || 
|-id=842 bgcolor=#E9E9E9
| 148842 ||  || — || November 10, 2001 || Socorro || LINEAR || — || align=right | 1.7 km || 
|-id=843 bgcolor=#E9E9E9
| 148843 ||  || — || November 11, 2001 || Socorro || LINEAR || EUN || align=right | 2.1 km || 
|-id=844 bgcolor=#E9E9E9
| 148844 ||  || — || November 9, 2001 || Socorro || LINEAR || — || align=right | 3.8 km || 
|-id=845 bgcolor=#E9E9E9
| 148845 ||  || — || November 9, 2001 || Socorro || LINEAR || — || align=right | 2.8 km || 
|-id=846 bgcolor=#E9E9E9
| 148846 ||  || — || November 9, 2001 || Socorro || LINEAR || — || align=right | 3.2 km || 
|-id=847 bgcolor=#E9E9E9
| 148847 ||  || — || November 9, 2001 || Socorro || LINEAR || — || align=right | 2.2 km || 
|-id=848 bgcolor=#E9E9E9
| 148848 ||  || — || November 9, 2001 || Socorro || LINEAR || — || align=right | 4.2 km || 
|-id=849 bgcolor=#E9E9E9
| 148849 ||  || — || November 9, 2001 || Socorro || LINEAR || WIT || align=right | 1.8 km || 
|-id=850 bgcolor=#E9E9E9
| 148850 ||  || — || November 9, 2001 || Socorro || LINEAR || — || align=right | 4.2 km || 
|-id=851 bgcolor=#fefefe
| 148851 ||  || — || November 9, 2001 || Socorro || LINEAR || NYS || align=right | 1.5 km || 
|-id=852 bgcolor=#E9E9E9
| 148852 ||  || — || November 9, 2001 || Socorro || LINEAR || HEN || align=right | 1.9 km || 
|-id=853 bgcolor=#E9E9E9
| 148853 ||  || — || November 9, 2001 || Socorro || LINEAR || — || align=right | 4.1 km || 
|-id=854 bgcolor=#E9E9E9
| 148854 ||  || — || November 9, 2001 || Socorro || LINEAR || XIZ || align=right | 2.6 km || 
|-id=855 bgcolor=#E9E9E9
| 148855 ||  || — || November 9, 2001 || Socorro || LINEAR || — || align=right | 2.5 km || 
|-id=856 bgcolor=#E9E9E9
| 148856 ||  || — || November 10, 2001 || Socorro || LINEAR || GEF || align=right | 2.2 km || 
|-id=857 bgcolor=#E9E9E9
| 148857 ||  || — || November 10, 2001 || Socorro || LINEAR || — || align=right | 2.5 km || 
|-id=858 bgcolor=#E9E9E9
| 148858 ||  || — || November 10, 2001 || Socorro || LINEAR || PAD || align=right | 4.5 km || 
|-id=859 bgcolor=#E9E9E9
| 148859 ||  || — || November 10, 2001 || Socorro || LINEAR || — || align=right | 2.3 km || 
|-id=860 bgcolor=#E9E9E9
| 148860 ||  || — || November 10, 2001 || Socorro || LINEAR || — || align=right | 3.6 km || 
|-id=861 bgcolor=#E9E9E9
| 148861 ||  || — || November 10, 2001 || Socorro || LINEAR || — || align=right | 2.6 km || 
|-id=862 bgcolor=#E9E9E9
| 148862 ||  || — || November 10, 2001 || Socorro || LINEAR || — || align=right | 3.3 km || 
|-id=863 bgcolor=#E9E9E9
| 148863 ||  || — || November 10, 2001 || Socorro || LINEAR || — || align=right | 3.1 km || 
|-id=864 bgcolor=#fefefe
| 148864 ||  || — || November 12, 2001 || Kitt Peak || Spacewatch || — || align=right | 1.7 km || 
|-id=865 bgcolor=#E9E9E9
| 148865 ||  || — || November 15, 2001 || Ondřejov || P. Pravec, P. Kušnirák || — || align=right | 2.1 km || 
|-id=866 bgcolor=#E9E9E9
| 148866 ||  || — || November 15, 2001 || Palomar || NEAT || — || align=right | 4.3 km || 
|-id=867 bgcolor=#E9E9E9
| 148867 ||  || — || November 15, 2001 || Palomar || NEAT || — || align=right | 3.1 km || 
|-id=868 bgcolor=#d6d6d6
| 148868 ||  || — || November 15, 2001 || Socorro || LINEAR || — || align=right | 5.8 km || 
|-id=869 bgcolor=#E9E9E9
| 148869 ||  || — || November 15, 2001 || Socorro || LINEAR || — || align=right | 5.5 km || 
|-id=870 bgcolor=#E9E9E9
| 148870 ||  || — || November 12, 2001 || Socorro || LINEAR || — || align=right | 3.1 km || 
|-id=871 bgcolor=#E9E9E9
| 148871 ||  || — || November 12, 2001 || Socorro || LINEAR || — || align=right | 3.8 km || 
|-id=872 bgcolor=#E9E9E9
| 148872 ||  || — || November 12, 2001 || Socorro || LINEAR || XIZ || align=right | 2.0 km || 
|-id=873 bgcolor=#E9E9E9
| 148873 ||  || — || November 12, 2001 || Socorro || LINEAR || — || align=right | 3.5 km || 
|-id=874 bgcolor=#E9E9E9
| 148874 ||  || — || November 12, 2001 || Socorro || LINEAR || — || align=right | 2.4 km || 
|-id=875 bgcolor=#E9E9E9
| 148875 ||  || — || November 12, 2001 || Socorro || LINEAR || — || align=right | 3.4 km || 
|-id=876 bgcolor=#E9E9E9
| 148876 ||  || — || November 12, 2001 || Socorro || LINEAR || WIT || align=right | 1.8 km || 
|-id=877 bgcolor=#E9E9E9
| 148877 ||  || — || November 10, 2001 || Palomar || NEAT || — || align=right | 2.6 km || 
|-id=878 bgcolor=#E9E9E9
| 148878 ||  || — || November 11, 2001 || Palomar || NEAT || — || align=right | 2.8 km || 
|-id=879 bgcolor=#E9E9E9
| 148879 ||  || — || November 12, 2001 || Socorro || LINEAR || — || align=right | 3.3 km || 
|-id=880 bgcolor=#E9E9E9
| 148880 ||  || — || November 17, 2001 || Haleakala || NEAT || INO || align=right | 2.4 km || 
|-id=881 bgcolor=#E9E9E9
| 148881 ||  || — || November 17, 2001 || Socorro || LINEAR || — || align=right | 3.2 km || 
|-id=882 bgcolor=#d6d6d6
| 148882 ||  || — || November 17, 2001 || Socorro || LINEAR || — || align=right | 4.5 km || 
|-id=883 bgcolor=#d6d6d6
| 148883 ||  || — || November 17, 2001 || Socorro || LINEAR || — || align=right | 4.4 km || 
|-id=884 bgcolor=#E9E9E9
| 148884 ||  || — || November 20, 2001 || Ondřejov || P. Pravec, P. Kušnirák || — || align=right | 2.1 km || 
|-id=885 bgcolor=#fefefe
| 148885 ||  || — || November 24, 2001 || Socorro || LINEAR || H || align=right | 1.2 km || 
|-id=886 bgcolor=#E9E9E9
| 148886 ||  || — || November 17, 2001 || Socorro || LINEAR || MAR || align=right | 1.9 km || 
|-id=887 bgcolor=#E9E9E9
| 148887 ||  || — || November 17, 2001 || Socorro || LINEAR || AST || align=right | 3.9 km || 
|-id=888 bgcolor=#E9E9E9
| 148888 ||  || — || November 17, 2001 || Socorro || LINEAR || XIZ || align=right | 2.6 km || 
|-id=889 bgcolor=#E9E9E9
| 148889 ||  || — || November 17, 2001 || Socorro || LINEAR || — || align=right | 4.3 km || 
|-id=890 bgcolor=#E9E9E9
| 148890 ||  || — || November 17, 2001 || Socorro || LINEAR || — || align=right | 2.3 km || 
|-id=891 bgcolor=#E9E9E9
| 148891 ||  || — || November 17, 2001 || Socorro || LINEAR || — || align=right | 2.5 km || 
|-id=892 bgcolor=#E9E9E9
| 148892 ||  || — || November 17, 2001 || Socorro || LINEAR || MRX || align=right | 2.3 km || 
|-id=893 bgcolor=#E9E9E9
| 148893 ||  || — || November 17, 2001 || Socorro || LINEAR || AEO || align=right | 1.7 km || 
|-id=894 bgcolor=#E9E9E9
| 148894 ||  || — || November 17, 2001 || Socorro || LINEAR || — || align=right | 2.6 km || 
|-id=895 bgcolor=#E9E9E9
| 148895 ||  || — || November 17, 2001 || Socorro || LINEAR || — || align=right | 3.1 km || 
|-id=896 bgcolor=#E9E9E9
| 148896 ||  || — || November 18, 2001 || Socorro || LINEAR || — || align=right | 2.3 km || 
|-id=897 bgcolor=#E9E9E9
| 148897 ||  || — || November 19, 2001 || Socorro || LINEAR || — || align=right | 2.1 km || 
|-id=898 bgcolor=#E9E9E9
| 148898 ||  || — || November 19, 2001 || Socorro || LINEAR || — || align=right | 2.1 km || 
|-id=899 bgcolor=#E9E9E9
| 148899 ||  || — || November 19, 2001 || Socorro || LINEAR || — || align=right | 1.9 km || 
|-id=900 bgcolor=#E9E9E9
| 148900 ||  || — || November 19, 2001 || Socorro || LINEAR || XIZ || align=right | 2.0 km || 
|}

148901–149000 

|-bgcolor=#E9E9E9
| 148901 ||  || — || November 20, 2001 || Socorro || LINEAR || — || align=right | 2.2 km || 
|-id=902 bgcolor=#E9E9E9
| 148902 ||  || — || November 20, 2001 || Socorro || LINEAR || — || align=right | 3.4 km || 
|-id=903 bgcolor=#E9E9E9
| 148903 ||  || — || November 20, 2001 || Socorro || LINEAR || MIS || align=right | 3.2 km || 
|-id=904 bgcolor=#E9E9E9
| 148904 ||  || — || November 20, 2001 || Socorro || LINEAR || HEN || align=right | 1.7 km || 
|-id=905 bgcolor=#E9E9E9
| 148905 ||  || — || November 21, 2001 || Socorro || LINEAR || DOR || align=right | 4.2 km || 
|-id=906 bgcolor=#E9E9E9
| 148906 ||  || — || November 21, 2001 || Socorro || LINEAR || — || align=right | 4.0 km || 
|-id=907 bgcolor=#E9E9E9
| 148907 ||  || — || November 21, 2001 || Socorro || LINEAR || — || align=right | 3.6 km || 
|-id=908 bgcolor=#E9E9E9
| 148908 ||  || — || December 9, 2001 || Palomar || NEAT || — || align=right | 3.4 km || 
|-id=909 bgcolor=#E9E9E9
| 148909 ||  || — || December 8, 2001 || Socorro || LINEAR || BRU || align=right | 4.5 km || 
|-id=910 bgcolor=#d6d6d6
| 148910 ||  || — || December 9, 2001 || Socorro || LINEAR || — || align=right | 5.6 km || 
|-id=911 bgcolor=#E9E9E9
| 148911 ||  || — || December 9, 2001 || Socorro || LINEAR || — || align=right | 3.9 km || 
|-id=912 bgcolor=#E9E9E9
| 148912 ||  || — || December 9, 2001 || Socorro || LINEAR || — || align=right | 4.4 km || 
|-id=913 bgcolor=#E9E9E9
| 148913 ||  || — || December 9, 2001 || Socorro || LINEAR || — || align=right | 3.4 km || 
|-id=914 bgcolor=#E9E9E9
| 148914 ||  || — || December 9, 2001 || Socorro || LINEAR || — || align=right | 3.6 km || 
|-id=915 bgcolor=#E9E9E9
| 148915 ||  || — || December 9, 2001 || Socorro || LINEAR || — || align=right | 3.5 km || 
|-id=916 bgcolor=#E9E9E9
| 148916 ||  || — || December 9, 2001 || Socorro || LINEAR || — || align=right | 4.7 km || 
|-id=917 bgcolor=#E9E9E9
| 148917 ||  || — || December 10, 2001 || Socorro || LINEAR || — || align=right | 4.6 km || 
|-id=918 bgcolor=#E9E9E9
| 148918 ||  || — || December 10, 2001 || Socorro || LINEAR || — || align=right | 3.6 km || 
|-id=919 bgcolor=#E9E9E9
| 148919 ||  || — || December 10, 2001 || Socorro || LINEAR || — || align=right | 2.7 km || 
|-id=920 bgcolor=#d6d6d6
| 148920 ||  || — || December 10, 2001 || Socorro || LINEAR || HYG || align=right | 3.4 km || 
|-id=921 bgcolor=#E9E9E9
| 148921 ||  || — || December 11, 2001 || Socorro || LINEAR || GEF || align=right | 2.5 km || 
|-id=922 bgcolor=#E9E9E9
| 148922 ||  || — || December 11, 2001 || Socorro || LINEAR || — || align=right | 2.5 km || 
|-id=923 bgcolor=#E9E9E9
| 148923 ||  || — || December 11, 2001 || Socorro || LINEAR || — || align=right | 2.7 km || 
|-id=924 bgcolor=#E9E9E9
| 148924 ||  || — || December 11, 2001 || Socorro || LINEAR || HEN || align=right | 2.0 km || 
|-id=925 bgcolor=#E9E9E9
| 148925 ||  || — || December 11, 2001 || Socorro || LINEAR || — || align=right | 2.5 km || 
|-id=926 bgcolor=#E9E9E9
| 148926 ||  || — || December 11, 2001 || Socorro || LINEAR || — || align=right | 2.4 km || 
|-id=927 bgcolor=#E9E9E9
| 148927 ||  || — || December 11, 2001 || Socorro || LINEAR || — || align=right | 3.8 km || 
|-id=928 bgcolor=#E9E9E9
| 148928 ||  || — || December 11, 2001 || Socorro || LINEAR || — || align=right | 3.8 km || 
|-id=929 bgcolor=#E9E9E9
| 148929 ||  || — || December 10, 2001 || Socorro || LINEAR || — || align=right | 2.9 km || 
|-id=930 bgcolor=#E9E9E9
| 148930 ||  || — || December 10, 2001 || Socorro || LINEAR || — || align=right | 1.5 km || 
|-id=931 bgcolor=#E9E9E9
| 148931 ||  || — || December 10, 2001 || Socorro || LINEAR || HEN || align=right | 1.7 km || 
|-id=932 bgcolor=#E9E9E9
| 148932 ||  || — || December 10, 2001 || Socorro || LINEAR || — || align=right | 2.3 km || 
|-id=933 bgcolor=#E9E9E9
| 148933 ||  || — || December 10, 2001 || Socorro || LINEAR || INO || align=right | 3.0 km || 
|-id=934 bgcolor=#d6d6d6
| 148934 ||  || — || December 10, 2001 || Socorro || LINEAR || — || align=right | 4.5 km || 
|-id=935 bgcolor=#E9E9E9
| 148935 ||  || — || December 10, 2001 || Socorro || LINEAR || — || align=right | 2.7 km || 
|-id=936 bgcolor=#E9E9E9
| 148936 ||  || — || December 11, 2001 || Socorro || LINEAR || — || align=right | 2.3 km || 
|-id=937 bgcolor=#d6d6d6
| 148937 ||  || — || December 13, 2001 || Socorro || LINEAR || — || align=right | 3.3 km || 
|-id=938 bgcolor=#d6d6d6
| 148938 ||  || — || December 13, 2001 || Socorro || LINEAR || TRP || align=right | 5.5 km || 
|-id=939 bgcolor=#E9E9E9
| 148939 ||  || — || December 14, 2001 || Socorro || LINEAR || — || align=right | 3.1 km || 
|-id=940 bgcolor=#d6d6d6
| 148940 ||  || — || December 14, 2001 || Socorro || LINEAR || — || align=right | 3.3 km || 
|-id=941 bgcolor=#E9E9E9
| 148941 ||  || — || December 14, 2001 || Socorro || LINEAR || — || align=right | 2.3 km || 
|-id=942 bgcolor=#E9E9E9
| 148942 ||  || — || December 14, 2001 || Socorro || LINEAR || AGN || align=right | 2.1 km || 
|-id=943 bgcolor=#E9E9E9
| 148943 ||  || — || December 14, 2001 || Socorro || LINEAR || — || align=right | 4.4 km || 
|-id=944 bgcolor=#d6d6d6
| 148944 ||  || — || December 14, 2001 || Socorro || LINEAR || KOR || align=right | 2.3 km || 
|-id=945 bgcolor=#E9E9E9
| 148945 ||  || — || December 14, 2001 || Socorro || LINEAR || HOF || align=right | 4.4 km || 
|-id=946 bgcolor=#E9E9E9
| 148946 ||  || — || December 14, 2001 || Socorro || LINEAR || AGN || align=right | 2.0 km || 
|-id=947 bgcolor=#E9E9E9
| 148947 ||  || — || December 14, 2001 || Socorro || LINEAR || DOR || align=right | 3.9 km || 
|-id=948 bgcolor=#E9E9E9
| 148948 ||  || — || December 14, 2001 || Socorro || LINEAR || — || align=right | 2.9 km || 
|-id=949 bgcolor=#E9E9E9
| 148949 ||  || — || December 14, 2001 || Socorro || LINEAR || — || align=right | 3.6 km || 
|-id=950 bgcolor=#E9E9E9
| 148950 ||  || — || December 14, 2001 || Socorro || LINEAR || AGN || align=right | 1.7 km || 
|-id=951 bgcolor=#E9E9E9
| 148951 ||  || — || December 14, 2001 || Socorro || LINEAR || HNA || align=right | 3.7 km || 
|-id=952 bgcolor=#d6d6d6
| 148952 ||  || — || December 14, 2001 || Socorro || LINEAR || — || align=right | 5.3 km || 
|-id=953 bgcolor=#E9E9E9
| 148953 ||  || — || December 14, 2001 || Socorro || LINEAR || GEF || align=right | 1.9 km || 
|-id=954 bgcolor=#E9E9E9
| 148954 ||  || — || December 11, 2001 || Socorro || LINEAR || — || align=right | 3.1 km || 
|-id=955 bgcolor=#fefefe
| 148955 ||  || — || December 11, 2001 || Socorro || LINEAR || — || align=right | 1.8 km || 
|-id=956 bgcolor=#E9E9E9
| 148956 ||  || — || December 11, 2001 || Socorro || LINEAR || — || align=right | 3.9 km || 
|-id=957 bgcolor=#E9E9E9
| 148957 ||  || — || December 11, 2001 || Socorro || LINEAR || — || align=right | 2.8 km || 
|-id=958 bgcolor=#E9E9E9
| 148958 ||  || — || December 14, 2001 || Socorro || LINEAR || AEO || align=right | 1.7 km || 
|-id=959 bgcolor=#E9E9E9
| 148959 ||  || — || December 15, 2001 || Socorro || LINEAR || — || align=right | 1.8 km || 
|-id=960 bgcolor=#E9E9E9
| 148960 ||  || — || December 15, 2001 || Socorro || LINEAR || — || align=right | 2.8 km || 
|-id=961 bgcolor=#E9E9E9
| 148961 ||  || — || December 15, 2001 || Socorro || LINEAR || — || align=right | 3.8 km || 
|-id=962 bgcolor=#E9E9E9
| 148962 ||  || — || December 15, 2001 || Socorro || LINEAR || — || align=right | 4.3 km || 
|-id=963 bgcolor=#E9E9E9
| 148963 ||  || — || December 15, 2001 || Socorro || LINEAR || — || align=right | 4.9 km || 
|-id=964 bgcolor=#E9E9E9
| 148964 ||  || — || December 15, 2001 || Socorro || LINEAR || — || align=right | 3.7 km || 
|-id=965 bgcolor=#E9E9E9
| 148965 ||  || — || December 15, 2001 || Socorro || LINEAR || — || align=right | 3.0 km || 
|-id=966 bgcolor=#E9E9E9
| 148966 ||  || — || December 15, 2001 || Socorro || LINEAR || — || align=right | 2.5 km || 
|-id=967 bgcolor=#d6d6d6
| 148967 ||  || — || December 15, 2001 || Socorro || LINEAR || KOR || align=right | 2.0 km || 
|-id=968 bgcolor=#E9E9E9
| 148968 ||  || — || December 15, 2001 || Socorro || LINEAR || — || align=right | 3.1 km || 
|-id=969 bgcolor=#d6d6d6
| 148969 ||  || — || December 15, 2001 || Socorro || LINEAR || KOR || align=right | 2.4 km || 
|-id=970 bgcolor=#E9E9E9
| 148970 ||  || — || December 15, 2001 || Socorro || LINEAR || — || align=right | 3.4 km || 
|-id=971 bgcolor=#d6d6d6
| 148971 ||  || — || December 15, 2001 || Socorro || LINEAR || CHA || align=right | 3.4 km || 
|-id=972 bgcolor=#E9E9E9
| 148972 ||  || — || December 15, 2001 || Socorro || LINEAR || — || align=right | 3.2 km || 
|-id=973 bgcolor=#E9E9E9
| 148973 ||  || — || December 14, 2001 || Socorro || LINEAR || — || align=right | 3.4 km || 
|-id=974 bgcolor=#E9E9E9
| 148974 ||  || — || December 14, 2001 || Socorro || LINEAR || AGN || align=right | 1.7 km || 
|-id=975 bgcolor=#C7FF8F
| 148975 ||  || — || December 9, 2001 || Mauna Kea || D. C. Jewitt, S. S. Sheppard, J. Kleyna || centaurcritical || align=right | 38 km || 
|-id=976 bgcolor=#E9E9E9
| 148976 ||  || — || December 14, 2001 || Kitt Peak || Spacewatch || — || align=right | 2.6 km || 
|-id=977 bgcolor=#E9E9E9
| 148977 ||  || — || December 18, 2001 || Socorro || LINEAR || — || align=right | 4.1 km || 
|-id=978 bgcolor=#E9E9E9
| 148978 ||  || — || December 18, 2001 || Socorro || LINEAR || — || align=right | 2.4 km || 
|-id=979 bgcolor=#d6d6d6
| 148979 ||  || — || December 18, 2001 || Socorro || LINEAR || — || align=right | 4.2 km || 
|-id=980 bgcolor=#E9E9E9
| 148980 ||  || — || December 18, 2001 || Socorro || LINEAR || — || align=right | 3.3 km || 
|-id=981 bgcolor=#E9E9E9
| 148981 ||  || — || December 18, 2001 || Socorro || LINEAR || — || align=right | 3.0 km || 
|-id=982 bgcolor=#E9E9E9
| 148982 ||  || — || December 18, 2001 || Socorro || LINEAR || — || align=right | 2.9 km || 
|-id=983 bgcolor=#E9E9E9
| 148983 ||  || — || December 18, 2001 || Socorro || LINEAR || — || align=right | 2.7 km || 
|-id=984 bgcolor=#E9E9E9
| 148984 ||  || — || December 18, 2001 || Socorro || LINEAR || — || align=right | 3.2 km || 
|-id=985 bgcolor=#E9E9E9
| 148985 ||  || — || December 18, 2001 || Socorro || LINEAR || HEN || align=right | 1.9 km || 
|-id=986 bgcolor=#E9E9E9
| 148986 ||  || — || December 18, 2001 || Socorro || LINEAR || HOF || align=right | 4.1 km || 
|-id=987 bgcolor=#E9E9E9
| 148987 ||  || — || December 18, 2001 || Socorro || LINEAR || — || align=right | 3.4 km || 
|-id=988 bgcolor=#E9E9E9
| 148988 ||  || — || December 18, 2001 || Socorro || LINEAR || — || align=right | 3.7 km || 
|-id=989 bgcolor=#E9E9E9
| 148989 ||  || — || December 18, 2001 || Socorro || LINEAR || — || align=right | 3.8 km || 
|-id=990 bgcolor=#E9E9E9
| 148990 ||  || — || December 17, 2001 || Kitt Peak || DLS || — || align=right | 2.1 km || 
|-id=991 bgcolor=#E9E9E9
| 148991 ||  || — || December 17, 2001 || Socorro || LINEAR || HEN || align=right | 2.0 km || 
|-id=992 bgcolor=#E9E9E9
| 148992 ||  || — || December 17, 2001 || Socorro || LINEAR || AGN || align=right | 2.1 km || 
|-id=993 bgcolor=#E9E9E9
| 148993 ||  || — || December 17, 2001 || Socorro || LINEAR || WIT || align=right | 2.0 km || 
|-id=994 bgcolor=#E9E9E9
| 148994 ||  || — || December 17, 2001 || Socorro || LINEAR || WIT || align=right | 2.0 km || 
|-id=995 bgcolor=#E9E9E9
| 148995 ||  || — || December 17, 2001 || Socorro || LINEAR || — || align=right | 4.0 km || 
|-id=996 bgcolor=#E9E9E9
| 148996 ||  || — || December 17, 2001 || Socorro || LINEAR || NEM || align=right | 4.5 km || 
|-id=997 bgcolor=#E9E9E9
| 148997 ||  || — || December 17, 2001 || Socorro || LINEAR || GEF || align=right | 2.3 km || 
|-id=998 bgcolor=#E9E9E9
| 148998 ||  || — || December 17, 2001 || Socorro || LINEAR || HOF || align=right | 5.0 km || 
|-id=999 bgcolor=#d6d6d6
| 148999 ||  || — || December 17, 2001 || Socorro || LINEAR || — || align=right | 3.9 km || 
|-id=000 bgcolor=#d6d6d6
| 149000 ||  || — || December 17, 2001 || Socorro || LINEAR || — || align=right | 4.5 km || 
|}

References

External links 
 Discovery Circumstances: Numbered Minor Planets (145001)–(150000) (IAU Minor Planet Center)

0148